

Deaths in March

Current sporting seasons

Australian rules football 2009

Australian Football League

Auto racing 2009

Formula One
Sprint Cup

Nationwide Series
Camping World Truck Series
A1 Grand Prix
GP2 Asia Series

WTTC
V8 Supercar
Speedcar Series
American Le Mans

Rolex Sports Car Series

Super GT

Basketball 2008–09

American competitions:
NBA
NCAA men tournament
NCAA women tournament
Pan-European competitions:
Euroleague
Eurocup
EuroChallenge

Greece
Iran
Israel
Italy
Philippines
Fiesta Conference
Spain
Turkey

Cricket 2008–09

Football (soccer)

2008–09
2010 FIFA World Cup Qualifying
UEFA (Europe) Champions League
UEFA Cup
Copa Libertadores (South America)
CONCACAF (North & Central America) Champions League
OFC (Oceania) Champions League
AFC (Asia) Champions League
CAF (Africa) Champions League
England
Germany
Iran
Italy
Spain
France
Argentina
2009
USA
Japan

Golf 2009

European Tour
PGA Tour
LPGA Tour

Ice hockey 2008–09

National Hockey League
Kontinental Hockey League

Motorcycle racing 2009

Superbike World championship
Supersport racing

Rugby league 2009

Super League
NRL

Rugby union 2008–09

Heineken Cup
English Premiership
Celtic League
Top 14
Super 14
Sevens World Series

Days of the month

March 31, 2009 (Tuesday)

Basketball
Euroleague Quarterfinals:
Game 3 of best-of-5 series:
TAU Cerámica  69–62  Regal FC Barcelona. TAU leads series 2–1.
Real Madrid  71–63  Olympiacos Piraeus. Olympiacos leads series 2–1.
Montepaschi Siena  53–72  Panathinaikos Athens. Panathinaikos leads series 2–1.
Partizan Igokea  56–67  CSKA Moscow. CSKA wins series 3–0.
CSKA advance to the Final Four for the seventh straight season.
NCAA Division I Women's Tournament
Regional Finals (seeding in parentheses):
Trenton region in Trenton, New Jersey:
(1) Connecticut 83, (6) Arizona State 64
Oklahoma City region in Oklahoma City, Oklahoma:
(1) Oklahoma 74, (6) Purdue 68
National Invitation Tournament:
Final Four in New York:
Semifinals:
Baylor 76, San Diego State 62
Penn State 67, Notre Dame 59
CollegeInsider.com Tournament:
Championship game in Peoria, Illinois:
Old Dominion 66, Bradley 62
NBA:
The Denver Nuggets clinch a playoff berth with 111–104 win over the New York Knicks.
The San Antonio Spurs also clinch a playoff berth despite losing 95–96 to the Oklahoma City Thunder.

Football (soccer)
2010 FIFA World Cup Qualifying:
CONMEBOL (South America), matchday 12:
 2–0 
Friendly internationals:
 0–2  in Lausanne, Switzerland
 0–2

March 30, 2009 (Monday)

Basketball
NCAA Division I Women's Tournament
Regional Finals (seeding in parentheses, all times EDT):
Raleigh region in Raleigh, North Carolina:
(3) Louisville 77, (1) Maryland 60
Berkeley region in Berkeley, California:
(2) Stanford 74, (4) Iowa State 53
College Basketball Invitational:
Championship best-of-3 series, game 1 in Corvallis, Oregon:
Oregon State 75, UTEP 69

Cricket
India in New Zealand:
2nd Test in Napier, day 5:
 619/9d;  305 and 476/4 (f/o, Gautam Gambhir 137, V.V.S. Laxman 124*). Match drawn, India lead 3-match series 1–0.

March 29, 2009 (Sunday)

Auto racing
Formula One:
Australian Grand Prix in Melbourne, Australia:
(1)  Jenson Button (2)  Rubens Barrichello (3)  Lewis Hamilton
Brawn GP take first and second in their first ever race, with Button becoming the first driver since Juan Manuel Fangio at the French Grand Prix in 1954 to win from pole in a first drive for a brand new team.
Jarno Trulli finished third in the race, but was given a 25-second penalty post-race for passing Hamilton under the stabilised safety car conditions, in which the race finished.
Sprint Cup Series:
Goody's Cool Orange 500 in Ridgeway, Virginia:
 (1) Jimmie Johnson  (2) Denny Hamlin  (3) Tony Stewart 
 Drivers' standings (after 6 races): (1) Jeff Gordon  959 points (2) Clint Bowyer  −89 (3) Kurt Busch  −132
V8 Supercars:
Sprint Gas V8 Supercars Manufacturers Challenge in Melbourne:
(1) Craig Lowndes  (2) Mark Winterbottom  (3) Will Davison

Basketball
NCAA Division I Men's Tournament:
Regional Finals (seeding in parentheses):
Midwest region in Indianapolis, Indiana:
(2) Michigan State 64, (1) Louisville 52
South region in Memphis, Tennessee:
(1) North Carolina 72, (2) Oklahoma 60
Final Four matchups:
Michigan State vs. Connecticut
North Carolina vs. Villanova
NCAA Division I Women's Tournament
Regional semifinals (seeding in parentheses):
Trenton region in Trenton, New Jersey:
(1) Connecticut 77, (4) California 53
(6) Arizona State 84, (2) Texas A&M 69
Oklahoma City region in Oklahoma City, Oklahoma:
(6) Purdue 67, (7) Rutgers 61
(1) Oklahoma 70, (4) Pittsburgh 59
 Sooners center Courtney Paris becomes the first player in U.S. college basketball history—regardless of governing body, division or gender—with 2,500 points and 2,000 rebounds in her career.
NBA:
The Los Angeles Lakers secure the #1 seed in the Western Conference and home advantage in the first three rounds of the playoffs despite losing 76–86 to the Atlanta Hawks, as their nearest rivals, the San Antonio Spurs, lose 86–90 to the New Orleans Hornets.

Cricket
India in New Zealand:
2nd Test in Napier, day 4:
 619/9d;  305 and 252/2 (f/o, Gautam Gambhir 102*). India trail by 62 runs with 8 wickets remaining.
England in West Indies:
4th ODI in Bridgetown, Barbados:
 239/9 (50 ov);  136/1 (18.3/20 ov). England win by 9 wickets (D/L method), 5-match series level 2–2.
Australia in South Africa:
2nd Twenty20 in Centurion:
 156/5 (20/20 ov);  139/8 (20/20 ov). South Africa win by 17 runs and win 2-match series 2–0.

Cycling
Track World Championships in Pruszków, Poland:
Women's keirin:  Guo Shuang   Clara Sanchez   Willy Kanis 
Men's omnium:  Leigh Howard  19 pts  Zachary Bell  21  Tim Veldt  24
Women's points race 25 km:  Giorgia Bronzini  18 pts  Yumari González  15  Elizabeth Armitstead  13
Men's sprint:
Final:  Grégory Baugé  beat  Azizul Hasni Awang  2–1
Bronze medal race:  Kévin Sireau  beat Shane Perkins  2–0

Football (soccer)
2010 FIFA World Cup Qualifying:
COMNEBOL (South America), matchday 11:
 1–1 
 1–3 
Standings after 11 of 18 rounds: Paraguay 23 pts, Argentina, Chile 19, Brazil 18, Uruguay 16, Colombia 14, Ecuador 13, Venezuela 10, Bolivia 9, Peru 7.
CAF (Africa) Third round, matchday 1:
Group 2:
 0–0 
Group 3:
 1–1 
Group 4:
 1–0 
Group 5:
 5–0 
22 spectators die and more than a hundred are injured in a stampede after a wall collapse in Félix Houphouët-Boigny Stadium shortly before the kick-off.

Golf
PGA Tour:
Arnold Palmer Invitational in Orlando, Florida:
Winner: Tiger Woods  275 (−5)
Woods wins his first title since his comeback from injury and sixth title at this tournament.
European Tour:
Open de Andalucia in Andalusia, Spain:
Winner: Søren Kjeldsen  274 (−14)
LPGA Tour:
Phoenix LPGA International in Phoenix, Arizona:
Winner: Karrie Webb  274 (−14)

Ice hockey
NHL:
The Detroit Red Wings clinch the Central Division title as their nearest rivals, the Chicago Blackhawks, lose 0–4 to the Vancouver Canucks.

Rowing
155th University Boat Race on the River Thames, London:
Oxford University Boat Club (Michal Plotkowiak, Colin Smith, Alex Hearne, Ben Harrison, Sjoerd Hamburger, Tom Solesbury, George Bridgewater, Ante Kušurin, Colin Groshong) 17:00 beat Cambridge University Boat Club (Rob Weitemeyer, Henry Pelly, Ryan Monaghan, Peter Marsland, Deaglan McEachern, Hardy Cubasch, Tom Ransley, Silas Stafford, Rebecca Dowbiggin) by 12 secs (3½ lengths)
The Dark Blues' win reduces Cambridge's overall lead to 79 against 75, with one dead heat.

Rugby union
Sevens World Series:
Hong Kong Sevens in Hong Kong
Final:  24–26

Winter sports

Biathlon
World Cup 9 in Khanty-Mansiysk, Russia:
15 km mass start men: (1) Simon Eder  37min 14.4sec (0 penalties) (2) Dominik Landertinger  at 12.1 (1) (3) Ole Einar Bjørndalen  17.0 (3)
Final overall World Cup standings (after 26 events): (1) Bjørndalen 1080 points (2) Tomasz Sikora  870 (3) Emil Hegle Svendsen  844
Final World Cup mass-start standings (after five events): (1) Landertinger 208 points (2) Bjørndalen 199 (3) Christoph Sumann  197
12.5 km mass start women: (1) Simone Hauswald  36:54.6 (1 penalty) (2) Helena Jonsson  at 15.1 (0) (3) Andrea Henkel  26.9 (3)... 6. Kati Wilhelm  1:20.3 (2)
Final overall World Cup standings (after 26 events): (1) Jonsson 952 points (2) Wilhelm 952 (3) Tora Berger  894
Jonsson wins the title because she won 4 races against 3 wins for Wilhelm.
Final World Cup mass-start standings (after five events): (1) Jonsson 210 points (2) Wilhelm 186 (3) Hauswald 174

Curling
World Women's Championship in Gangneung, South Korea: (seeding in parentheses)
Final:
 (1)  China 8–6  (4)  Sweden
Bronze medal game:
 (2)  Denmark 7–6 (3)  Canada

March 28, 2009 (Saturday)

Athletics
World Cross Country Championships in Amman, Jordan:
Senior men – 12 km:  Gebregziabher Gebremariam  35:02  Moses Kipsiro  35:04  Zersenay Tadese  35:04
Teams:   28   28   50
Senior women – 8 km:  Florence Jebet Kiplagat  26:13  Linet Chepkwemoi Masai  26:16  Meselech Melkamu  26:19
Teams:   14   28   72

Basketball
NCAA Division I Men's Tournament:
Regional Finals (seeding in parentheses):
West region in Glendale, Arizona:
(1) Connecticut 82, (3) Missouri 75
East region in Boston, Massachusetts:
(3) Villanova 78, (1) Pittsburgh 76
NCAA Division I Women's Tournament
Regional semifinals (seeding in parentheses):
Raleigh region in Raleigh, North Carolina:
(3) Louisville 56, (2) Baylor 39
(1) Maryland 78, (4) Vanderbilt 74
Berkeley region in Berkeley, California:
(4) Iowa State 69, (9) Michigan State 68
(2) Stanford 84, (3) Ohio State 66

Cricket
India in New Zealand:
2nd Test in Napier, day 3:
 619/9d;  305 and 47/1 (f/o). India trail by 267 runs with 9 wickets remaining.

Cycling
Track World Championships in Pruszków, Poland:
Women's omnium:  Josephine Tomic  26  Tara Whitten  27  Yvonne Hijgenaar  27
Women's Sprint:
Final:  Victoria Pendleton  bt  Willy Kanis  2–1
Bronze medal race:  Simona Krupeckaitė  bt Olga Panarina  2–0
Men's madison 50 km:   (Michael Mørkøv, Alex Rasmussen)   (Leigh Howard, Cameron Meyer)   (Martin Bláha, Jiří Hochmann)

Football (soccer)
2010 FIFA World Cup Qualifying:
UEFA (Europe):
Group 1:
 0–3 
 0–1 
 0–0 
Denmark and Hungary lead the group on 10 points.
Group 2:
 0–4 
 0–2 
 1–1 
Greece and Switzerland share the lead on 10 points, with Israel one point behind.
Group 3:
 3–2 
 0–0 
Northern Ireland goes to the top of the group on 10 points from 6 games, followed by Slovakia on 9 points from 4 games.
Group 4:
 2–0 
 0–2 
 4–0 
Germany lead the group on 13 points, Russia second on 9 points and a game in hand.
Group 5:
 2–2 
 2–4 
 1–0 
Spain lead the group with perfect record of 15 points from 5 games.
Group 7:
 2–3 
 0–1 
Serbia on top with 12 points, followed by Lithuania on 9 points.
Group 8:
 2–1 
 0–2 
 1–1 
Italy takes sole possession of first place on 13 points, 2 points ahead of Ireland.
Group 9:
 3–0 
Netherlands maintains its perfect record with 12 points from 4 games.
COMNEBOL (South America), matchday 11:
 2–0 
 4–0 
 2–0 
Argentina win its first official match with Diego Maradona as coach, and leap over Brazil into second place on 19 points, 4 points befind leader Paraguay. Uruguay goes into fourth place on 16 pts. Colombia in sixth place on 14 pts.
CONCACAF (North-Central America) Fourth Round, matchday 2:
 1–1 
 The Soca Warriors salvage a point at home courtesy of a Khaleem Hyland goal in the 90th minute.
 2–0 
Mexico gets level with Costa Rica in second place on 3 points.
 2–2 
 Team USA comes back from a 2–0 deficit in San Salvador behind goals from Jozy Altidore and Frankie Hejduk, and takes sole possession of first place in the hexagonal with 4 points from 2 matches.
AFC (Asia) Fourth Round, matchday 6:
Group A:
 1–0 
Japan goes to the top of the group, with 11 points from 5 games, ahead of Australia with 10 pts from 4 games.
 4–0 
Uzbekistan gets level with Bahrain and Qatar on 5 points
Group B:
 2–0 
North Korea goes to the top of the group with 10 points from 5 games, ahead of South Korea with 8 points from 4 games.
 1–2 
Saudi Arabia replace Iran in third place on 7 points.
CAF (Africa) Third round, matchday 1:
Group 1:
 1–0 
 1–2 
Group 2:
 1–2 
Group 3:
 0–0 
Group 4:
 1–1 
Group 5:
 4–2 
Friendly internationals:
 4–0 
David Beckham comes in as substitute for his 109th cap, a record for an English outfield player.
 2–1 
 2–1 
OFC Champions League Group stage, matchday 6:
Group B: Koloale FC Honiara  1–0  Ba F.C.
Koloale advance to the final.

Winter sports

Biathlon
World Cup 9 in Khanty-Mansiysk, Russia:
12.5 km pursuit men: (1) Emil Hegle Svendsen  33mins 03.3secs (2 penalties) (2) Ole Einar Bjørndalen  at 0.1 (2) (3) Christoph Sumann  23.8 (2)
Overall World Cup standings (after 25 of 26 events): (1) Bjørndalen 1032 points (champion) (2) Tomasz Sikora  863 (3) Svendsen 818
Final World Cup pursuit standings (after seven events): (1) Bjørndalen 342 (2) Svendsen 308 (3) Sikora 276
10 km pursuit women: (1) Magdalena Neuner  27min 53.0sec (2 penalties) (2) Michela Ponza  at 28.8 (0) (3) Marie Dorin  30.5 (1)
Overall World Cup standings (after 25 of 26 events): (1) Helena Jonsson  915 points (2) Kati Wilhelm  915 (3) Neuner 878
Final World Cup pursuit standings (after seven events): (1) Wilhelm 272 points (2) Tora Berger  246 (3) Martina Beck  244

Curling
World Women's Championship in Gangneung, South Korea: (seeding in parentheses)
Playoffs:
(3)  Canada 4–5 (4)  Sweden (11 ends)
Sweden will play against Denmark in the semifinal, Canada will play for bronze medal.
Semifinal:
(2)  Denmark 6–7 (4)  Sweden
Sweden advance to the final against China, Denmark will play for bronze medal against Canada.

Figure skating
World Championships in Los Angeles, United States:
Ladies:  Kim Yuna  207.71  Joannie Rochette  191.29  Miki Ando  190.38
Kim becomes the first ever World champion in figure skating from Korea, and the first woman to score over 200 points. Rochette is the first Canadian woman to win a medal in 21 years.

March 27, 2009 (Friday)

Basketball
NCAA Division I Men's Tournament:
Regional semifinals (seeding in parentheses):
Midwest region in Indianapolis, Indiana:
(1) Louisville 103, (12) Arizona 64
(2) Michigan State 67, (3) Kansas 62
South region in Memphis, Tennessee:
(2) Oklahoma 84, (3) Syracuse 71
(1) North Carolina 98, (4) Gonzaga 77

Cricket
India in New Zealand:
2nd Test in Napier, day 2:
 619/9d (Jesse Ryder 201, Brendon McCullum 115);  79/3. India trail by 540 runs with 7 wickets remaining in the 1st innings.
England in West Indies:
3rd ODI in Bridgetown, Barbados:
 117 (41.3/44 ov);  117/2 (14.4/44 ov, Chris Gayle 80). West Indies win by 8 wickets (D/L method), lead 5-match series 2–1.
Australia in South Africa:
1st Twenty20 in Johannesburg:
 166/7 (20/20 ov, David Hussey 88*);  168/6 (19.2/20 ov). South Africa win by 4 wickets with 4 balls remaining, lead 2-match series 1–0.

Cycling
Track World Championships in Pruszków, Poland:
Men's 1 km time trial:  Stefan Nimke  1:00.666  Taylor Phinney  1:01.611  Mohd Rizal Tisin  1:01.658
Women's scratch 10 km:  Yumari González Valdinieso   Lizzie Armitstead   Belinda Goss 
Men's team pursuit:
Final:   (Casper Jørgensen, Jens-Erik Madsen, Michael Mørkøv, Alex Rasmussen) 3min 58.246 bt   (Jack Bobridge, Rohan Dennis, Leigh Howard, Cameron Meyer) 3:58.863
Bronze medal race:   (Westley Gough, Peter Latham, Marc Ryan, Jesse Sergent) 4:00.248 bt  (Jonathan Bellis, Steven Burke, Ed Clancy, Peter Kennaugh) 4:01.838

Winter sports

Biathlon
World Cup 9 in Khanty-Mansiysk, Russia:
7.5 km sprint women: (1) Tina Bachmann  20min 49.8sec (0 penalties) (2) Simone Hauswald  at 3.7s (0) (3) Anna Carin Olofsson-Zidek  19.3 (0)
Overall World Cup standings (after 24 of 26 events): (1) Helena Jonsson  904 points (2) Kati Wilhelm  893 (3) Magdalena Neuner  832
Final World Cup sprint standings (after 10 events): (1) Jonsson 372 points (2) Neuner 358 (3) Tora Berger  352

Curling
World Women's Championship in Gangneung, South Korea: (seeding in parentheses)
Playoffs:
(1)  China 6–3 (2)  Denmark
China advance to the final, Denmark will play against Canada/Sweden winner

Figure skating
World Championships in Los Angeles, United States:
Ladies' short program: (1) Kim Yuna  76.12 (2) Joannie Rochette  67.90 (3) Mao Asada  66.06
Ice dance:  Oksana Domnina / Maxim Shabalin  206.30  Tanith Belbin / Benjamin Agosto  205.08  Tessa Virtue / Scott Moir  200.40

March 26, 2009 (Thursday)

Basketball
Euroleague Quarterfinals:
Game 2 of best-of-5 series:
CSKA Moscow  77–50  Partizan Igokea. CSKA leads series 2–0.
Olympiacos Piraeus  79–73  Real Madrid. Olympiacos leads series 2–0.
Regal FC Barcelona  85–62  TAU Cerámica. Series tied 1–1.
Panathinaikos Athens  79–84  Montepaschi Siena. Series tied 1–1.
NCAA Division I Men's Tournament:
Regional semifinals (seeding in parentheses):
West region in Glendale, Arizona:
(1) Connecticut 72, (5) Purdue 60
(3) Missouri 102, (2) Memphis 91
East region in Boston, Massachusetts:
(1) Pittsburgh 60, (4) Xavier 55
(3) Villanova 77, (2) Duke 54

Cricket
India in New Zealand:
2nd Test in Napier, day 1:
 351/4 (Ross Taylor 151, Jesse Ryder 137*)

Cycling
Track World Championships in Pruszków, Poland:
Men's scratch 15 km:  Morgan Kneisky   Angel Colla   Andreas Müller 
Women's team sprint:
Final:   (Anna Meares, Kaarle McCulloch) 33.149sec bt   (Shanaze Reade, Victoria Pendleton) 33.380
Bronze medal race:   (Gintarė Gaivenytė, Simona Krupeckaitė) 33.495 bt  (Sandie Clair, Clara Sanchez) 33.638
Men's individual pursuit:
Final:  Taylor Phinney  4min 15.160sec bt  Jack Bobridge  4:17.419
Bronze medal race:  Dominique Cornu  4:19.197 bt Volodymyr Dyudya  4:19.786
Women's team pursuit:
Final:   (Wendy Houvenaghel, Joanna Rowsell, Lizzie Armitstead) 3:25.147 bt   (Lauren Ellis, Jaime Nielsen, Alison Shanks) 3:26.023
Bronze medal race:   (Ashlee Ankudinoff, Sarah Kent, Josephine Tomic) 3:27.719 bt  (Vera Koedooder, Amy Pieters, Ellen van Dijk) 3:30.893
Men's keirin:  Maximilian Levy   François Pervis   Teun Mulder

Winter sports

Biathlon
World Cup 9 in Khanty-Mansiysk, Russia:
10 km sprint men: (1) Arnd Peiffer  25min 51.1sec (0 penalties) (2) Ole Einar Bjørndalen  at 23.1s (1) (3) Christoph Sumann  27.3 (0)
World Cup overall standings (after 24 of 26 events): (1) Bjørndalen 978 points (2) Tomasz Sikora  854 (3) Emil Hegle Svendsen  & Maxim Tchoudov  758
Bjørndalen secure his sixth overall World Cup title.
Final World Cup sprint standings (after 10 events): (1) Bjørndalen 372 points (2) Sikora 337 (3) Svendsen 318

Curling
World Women's Championship in Gangneung, South Korea:(teams in bold advance to the playoff, teams in italics play in tiebreaker)
Draw 15:
 Sweden 7–8  China
 Scotland 7–6  United States
 Italy 5–8  Canada
Canada secure a playoff berth.
 South Korea 8–10  Russia
Standings after 15 draws: China 9–1, Canada 8–2, Denmark 7–2, Sweden 6–4, Switzerland  5–4, Russia, Scotland 5–5, Germany 4–5.
Draw 16:
 Denmark 6–2  Scotland
Denmark secure a playoff berth, while Scotland is eliminated
 Norway 2–11  Sweden
Sweden secure at least a tiebreaker place.
 Germany 9–6  South Korea
 Switzerland 8–5  Italy
Switzerland remain in contention for a tiebreaker.
Standings after 16 draws: China 9–1, Canada, Denmark 8–2, Sweden 7–4, Switzerland 6–4.
Draw 17:
 Russia 6–8  Germany
 Canada 10–7  Switzerland
Switzerland's loss means Sweden advance to the playoff.
 United States 3–9  Denmark
 China 7–2  Norway
Final standings: China 10–1, Denmark, Canada 9–2, Sweden 7–4, Switzerland, Germany 6–5, Russia, Scotland 5–6, USA 4–7, Korea 3–8, Norway, Italy 1–10.

Figure skating
World Championships in Los Angeles, United States:
Ice dance standings after original dance: (1) Oksana Domnina – Maxim Shabalin  105.45 (2) Tanith Belbin – Benjamin Agosto  104.81 (3) Tessa Virtue – Scott Moir  100.42
Men:  Evan Lysacek  242.23  Patrick Chan  237.58  Brian Joubert  235.97

March 25, 2009 (Wednesday)

Basketball
NBA:
The Orlando Magic clinch the Southeast Division title and at least a #4 seed in the playoff with an 84–82 win over the Boston Celtics.
The Atlanta Hawks clinch a playoff berth despite a 92–102 loss to the San Antonio Spurs.

Cycling
Track World Championships in Pruszków, Poland:
Women's 500 m time trial:  Simona Krupeckaitė  33.296 (WR)  Anna Meares  33.796  Victoria Pendleton  34.102
Men's points race 40 km:  Cameron Meyer  24 points  Daniel Kreutzfeldt  22  Chris Newton  21
Women's individual pursuit:
Final:  Alison Shanks  3:29.807 def.  Wendy Houvenaghel  3:32.174
Bronze medal race:  Vilija Sereikaitė  3:33.583 def. Joanna Rowsell  3:35.209
Men's team sprint:
Final:   (Grégory Baugé, Mickaël Bourgain, Kévin Sireau) 43.512 def.   (Matthew Crampton, Jason Kenny, Jamie Staff) 43.869
Bronze medal race:   (René Enders, Robert Förstemann, Stefan Nimke) 43.912 def.  (Daniel Ellis, Shane Perkins, Scott Sunderland) 43.986

Football (soccer)
Copa Libertadores group stage:
Group 7:
Aurora  1–2  Grêmio

Ice hockey
NHL:
The New Jersey Devils and Washington Capitals clinch playoff berths as a result of Florida Panthers 3–5 loss to Buffalo Sabres.

Winter sports

Curling
World Women's Championship in Gangneung, South Korea:
Draw 12:
 South Korea 6–7  Canada
 Italy 6–7  Russia (11 ends)
 Scotland 3–4  China (11 ends)
 Sweden 5–10  United States
Draw 13:
 United States 2–8  Switzerland
 China 8–2  Germany
 Russia 7–2  Norway
 Canada 5–7  Denmark
Draw 14:
 Norway 8–6  Italy
 Denmark 4–7  South Korea
 Switzerland 6–8  Sweden
 Germany 7–6  Scotland (11 ends)
Standings after 14 draws (teams in bold advance to the playoffs, teams in italics secure at least a tie breaker, teams in strike are eliminated): China 8–1, Canada, Denmark 7–2, Sweden 6–3, Switzerland 5–4, Germany, Russia, Scotland, USA 4–5, Korea 3–6, Italy, Norway 1–8.

Figure skating
World Championships in Los Angeles, United States:
Men's short program: (1) Brian Joubert  84.40 (2) Evan Lysacek  82.70 (3) Patrick Chan  82.55
Pairs:  Aliona Savchenko/Robin Szolkowy  203.48  Zhang Dan/Zhang Hao  186.52  Yuko Kavaguti/Alexander Smirnov  186.39

March 24, 2009 (Tuesday)

Basketball
Euroleague Quarterfinals:
Game 1 of best-of-5 series:
CSKA Moscow  56–47  Partizan Igokea. CSKA leads series 1–0.
Panathinaikos Athens  90–85  Montepaschi Siena. Panathinaikos leads series 1–0.
Olympiacos Piraeus  88–79  Real Madrid. Olympiacos leads series 1–0.
Regal FC Barcelona  75–84  TAU Cerámica. TAU leads series 1–0.
NCAA Division I Women's Tournament:
Second round (seeding in parentheses):
Trenton Region:
(1) Connecticut 87, (8) Florida 59
(2) Texas A&M 73, (10) Minnesota 42
Berkeley Region:
(9) Michigan State 63, (1) Duke 49
(4) Iowa State 71, (12) Ball State 57
Raleigh Region:
(1) Maryland 71, (9) Utah 56
(3) Louisville 62, (6) LSU 52
(2) Baylor 60, (7) South Dakota State 58
Oklahoma City Region:
(1) Oklahoma 69, (9) Georgia Tech 50

Cricket
 News:
 The Board of Control for Cricket in India announces that the second season of the Indian Premier League will be moved to South Africa due to security concerns. (Cricinfo)

Winter sports

Curling
World Women's Championship in Gangneung, South Korea:
Draw 9:
 China 8–5  Denmark
 United States 12–7  Norway
 Canada 8–7  Germany
 Russia 4–8  Switzerland
Draw 10:
 Germany 10–1  Sweden
 Switzerland 5–7  Scotland
 Denmark 7–4  Italy
 Norway 8–9  South Korea
Draw 11:
 Scotland 4–6  Russia
 South Korea 2–9  United States
 Sweden 7–4  Canada
 Italy 3–9  China
Standings after 11 draws: Canada, China, Denmark 6–1, Sweden 5–2, Scotland, Switzerland 4–3, Germany, USA 3–4, Korea, Russia 2–5, Italy 1–6, Norway 0–7.

Figure skating
World Championships in Los Angeles, United States:
Compulsory Dance: (1) Oksana Domnina / Maxim Shabalin  40.77 (2) Tanith Belbin / Benjamin Agosto  39.65 (3) Tessa Virtue / Scott Moir  39.37
Pairs Short Program: (1) Aliona Savchenko / Robin Szolkowy  72.30 (2) Yuko Kavaguti / Alexander Smirnov  68.94 (3) Dan Zhang / Hao Zhang  67.42

March 23, 2009 (Monday)

Baseball
World Baseball Classic:
Final in Los Angeles, California, United States:
 3–5  (10 innings)
 Ichiro Suzuki hits a two-run single in the top of the 10th, and Yu Darvish closes the door on South Korea as Japan successfully defends its 2006 title. Japan's Daisuke Matsuzaka is named MVP for the second time in two Classics.

Basketball
NCAA Division I Women's Tournament:
Second round (seeding in parentheses):
Trenton region:
(6) Arizona State 63, (3) Florida State 58
(4) California 99, (5) Virginia 73
Berkeley region:
(3) Ohio State 64, (11) Mississippi State 58
(2) Stanford 77, (10) San Diego State 49
Raleigh region:
(4) Vanderbilt 74, (5) Kansas State 61
Oklahoma City region:
(6) Purdue 85, (3) North Carolina 70
(7) Rutgers 80, (2) Auburn 52
(4) Pittsburgh 65, (12) Gonzaga 60

Winter sports

Curling
World Women's Championship in Gangneung, South Korea:
Draw 6:
 Switzerland 7–6  South Korea
 Germany 8–1  Italy
 Norway 7–8  Scotland (11 ends)
 Denmark 7–6  Sweden (11 ends)
Draw 7:
 Italy 9–6  United States
 South Korea 6–7  China
 Sweden 9–3  Russia
 Scotland 3–9  Canada
Draw 8:
 Canada 8–5  Norway
 Russia 4–7  Denmark
 China 8–7  Switzerland
 United States 7–6  Germany
Standings after 8 draws: Canada, Denmark 5–0, China, Sweden 4–1, Scotland, Switzerland 3–2, Germany 2–3, Italy, South Korea, Russia, USA 1–4, Norway 0–5.

March 22, 2009 (Sunday)

Athletics

Tokyo Marathon:
Men: (1) Salim Kipsang  2hr 10min 27sec (2) Kazuhiro Maeda  2:11:01 (3) Kensuke Takahashi  2:11:25
Women: (1) Mizuho Nasukawa  2:25:38 (2) Yukari Sahaku  2:28:55 (3) Reiko Tosa  2:29:19

Auto racing
Sprint Cup Series:
Food City 500 in Bristol, Tennessee
 (1) Kyle Busch  (2) Denny Hamlin  (3) Jimmie Johnson 
 Drivers' standings (after 5 races): (1) Jeff Gordon  794 points (2) Kurt Busch  −76 (3) Clint Bowyer  −79
V8 Supercars:
Clipsal 500 in Adelaide
Round 2: (1) Jamie Whincup  (2) Will Davison  (3) Garth Tander 
Standings (after 2 of 26 races): (1) Whincup 300 (2) W. Davison 267 (3) Lee Holdsworth 249
WTCC:
HSBC Race of Mexico in Puebla, Mexico:
Round 3: (1) Rickard Rydell  (2) Augusto Farfus  (3) Andy Priaulx 
Round 4: (1) Yvan Muller  (2) Priaulx (3) Rydell
Drivers' standings (after 4 of 24 events): (1) Muller & Rydell 30 points (3) Farfus 20

Baseball
World Baseball Classic:
Semifinals in Los Angeles, California, United States:
 4–9

Basketball
NCAA Division I Men's Tournament:
Second round (seeding in parentheses):
Midwest region:
(1) Louisville 79, (9) Siena 72 in Dayton, Ohio
(12) Arizona 71, (13) Cleveland State 57 in Miami, Florida
(3) Kansas 60, (11) Dayton 43 in Minneapolis, Minnesota
(2) Michigan State 74, (10) USC 69 in Minneapolis, Minnesota
West region:
(3) Missouri 83, (6) Marquette 79 in Boise, Idaho
East region:
(1) Pittsburgh 84, (8) Oklahoma State 76 in Dayton, Ohio
(4) Xavier 60, (5) Wisconsin 49 in Boise, Idaho
South region:
(3) Syracuse 78, (6) Arizona State 67 in Miami, Florida
NCAA Division I Women's Tournament:
First round (seeding in parentheses):
Trenton Region:
(1) Connecticut 104, (16) Vermont 65
(8) Florida 70, (9) Temple 57
(10) Minnesota 79, (7) Notre Dame 71
(2) Texas A&M 80, (15) Evansville 45
Berkeley Region:
(1) Duke 83, (16) Austin Peay 42
(9) Michigan State 60, (8) Middle Tennessee 59
(4) Iowa State 85, (13) East Tennessee State 53
(12) Ball State 71, (5) Tennessee 55
The Cardinals inflict on the two-time defending champion Lady Vols their first loss in the first or second round in school history. Tennessee also becomes the first ever defending champion to lose in the first round.
Raleigh Region:
(1) Maryland 82, (16) Dartmouth 53
(9) Utah 60, (8) Villanova 30
(6) LSU 69, (11) UW-Green Bay 59
(3) Louisville 62, (14) Liberty 42
(7) South Dakota State 90, (10) TCU 55
(2) Baylor 87, (15) Texas-San Antonio 82 (OT)
Oklahoma City Region:
(1) Oklahoma 76, (16) Prairie View 47
(9) Georgia Tech 76, (8) Iowa 62

Cricket
Australia in South Africa:
3rd Test in Cape Town, day 4:
 209 & 422 (Mitchell Johnson 123*);  651. South Africa win by an innings and 20 runs; Australia win 3-match series 2–1.
South Africa inflict an innings defeat on Australia for the first time since India inflicted an innings & 219 runs defeat in March 1998. However, Australia had already won the series.
England in West Indies:
2nd ODI in Providence, Guyana:
 264/8 (50 ov);  243 (48.2 ov). West Indies win by 21 runs, 5-match series level 1–1.
Women's World Cup in Australia:
Final:
 166 (47.2 ov);  167/6 (46.1 ov) in North Sydney. England win by 4 wickets and wins the title for the third time. Claire Taylor was named player of the tournament.

Golf
PGA Tour:
Transitions Championship in Palm Harbor, Florida:
Winner:  Retief Goosen 276 (−8)
European Tour:
Madeira Island Open in Madeira, Portugal:
Winner:  Estanislao Goya 278 (−6)
LPGA Tour:
MasterCard Classic in Mexico City, Mexico:
Winner:  Pat Hurst 206 (−10)

Ice hockey
NHL:
The Boston Bruins clinch the Northeast Division title and the first playoff berth in the Eastern Conference with 4–1 win over the New Jersey Devils.

Tennis
ATP Tour and WTA Tour:
BNP Paribas Open in Indian Wells, California, United States:
Men's final:  Rafael Nadal def.  Andy Murray 6–1, 6–2
Women's final:  Vera Zvonareva def.  Ana Ivanovic, 7–6(5), 6–2

Winter sports

Biathlon
World Cup 8 in Trondheim, Norway:
15 km mass start men: (1) Ole Einar Bjørndalen  41mins 12.9secs (0 penalties) (2) Simon Eder  at 39.1 (1) (3) Emil Hegle Svendsen  53.4 (2)
Overall World Cup standings (after 23 of the 26 races): (1) Bjørndalen 924 points (2) Tomasz Sikora  853 (3) Maxim Tchoudov  737
Mass start standings (after 4 of 5 races): (1) Bjørndalen 191 points (2) Christoph Sumann  175 (3) Dominik Landertinger  154
12.5 km mass start women: (1) Tora Berger  39:29.7 (1) (2) Simone Hauswald  39:30.7 (2) (3) Sandrine Bailly  39:31.8 (1)
Overall World Cup standings (after 23 of the 26 races): (1) Helena Jonsson  894 points (2) Kati Wilhelm  872 (3) Berger 800
Mass start standings (after 4 of 5 races): (1) Jonsson 185 points (2) Wilhelm 159 (3) Olga Zaitseva  154

Cross-country skiing
World Cup in Falun, Sweden:
15 km freestyle handicap men: (1) Dario Cologna  1:40:45.3 (2) Vincent Vittoz  at 41.3 (3) Alexander Legkov  1:05.4
Final overall World Cup rankings: (1) Cologna 1344 points (2) Petter Northug  1217 (3) Ola Vigen Hattestad  792
10 km freestyle handicap women: (1) Justyna Kowalczyk  1:06:06.8 (2) Therese Johaug  at 20.0 (3) Charlotte Kalla  23.4
Final overall World Cup rankings: (1) Kowalczyk 1810 points (2) Petra Majdič  1710 (3) Aino-Kaisa Saarinen  1463

Curling
World Women's Championship in Gangneung, South Korea:
Draw 3:
 Germany 5–3  Norway
 Switzerland 8–9  Denmark
Draw 4:
 China 9–3  Russia
 Sweden 8–5  Scotland
 Italy 4–6  South Korea
 Canada 10–3  United States
Draw 5:
 Denmark 7–6  Germany
 Russia 5–8  Canada
 United States 4–8  China
 Norway 6–8  Switzerland
Standings after draw 5: Canada, Denmark, Sweden 3–0, China, Scotland, Switzerland 2–1, Germany, Korea, Russia 1–2, Italy, Norway, USA 0–3

Ski jumping
World Cup in Planica, Slovenia:
HS215: (1) Harri Olli  424.6 points (211.0m, 219.5m) (2) Adam Małysz  412.4 (210.0m, 209.5m) (3) Simon Ammann  409.6 (210.0m, 208.0m) & Robert Kranjec  409.6 (205.5m, 212.5m)
Final World Cup Overall standings: (1) Gregor Schlierenzauer  2083 points (2) Ammann 1776 (3) Wolfgang Loitzl  1396
Final World Cup Ski Flying standings: (1) Schlierenzauer 477 points (2) Olli 372 points (3) Ammann 370
Final Nations Cup standings: (1)  7331 points (2)  4270 (3)  4175

Snowboarding
World Cup in Valmalenco, Italy:
Parallel GS men: (1) Jasey-Jay Anderson  (2) Benjamin Karl  (3) Siegfried Grabner 
Grabner wins the overall and parallel World Cup titles.
Parallel GS women: (1) Amelie Kober  (2) Caroline Calve  (3) Doris Guenther 
Guenther wins the overall World Cup title, Kober wins the parallel title.

March 21, 2009 (Saturday)

Auto racing
Nationwide Series:
Scotts Turf Builder 300 in Bristol, Tennessee:
(1) Kevin Harvick  (2) Carl Edwards  (3) Clint Bowyer 
V8 Supercars:
Clipsal 500 in Adelaide
Round 1: (1) Jamie Whincup  (2) Lee Holdsworth  (3) Will Davison 
American Le Mans Series:
12 Hours of Sebring in Sebring, Florida, United States
(1) Allan McNish , Rinaldo Capello  & Tom Kristensen  (2) Franck Montagny , Stéphane Sarrazin  & Sébastien Bourdais  (3) Mike Rockenfeller , Lucas Luhr  & Marco Werner

Baseball
World Baseball Classic:
Semifinals in Los Angeles, California, United States:
 10–2

Basketball
NCAA Division I Men's Tournament:
Second round (seeding in parentheses):
West region:
(1) Connecticut 92, (9) Texas A&M 66
(5) Purdue 76, (4) Washington 74
(2) Memphis 89, (10) Maryland 70
East region:
(3) Villanova 89, (6) UCLA 69
(2) Duke 74, (7) Texas 69
South region:
(1) North Carolina 84, (8) LSU 70
(4) Gonzaga 83, (12) Western Kentucky 81
(2) Oklahoma 73, (10) Michigan 63
NCAA Division I Women's Tournament:
First round (seeding in parentheses):
Trenton region:
(6) Arizona State 58, (11) Georgia 47
(3) Florida State 83, (14) North Carolina A&T 71
(4) California 70, (13) Fresno State 47
(5) Virginia 68, (12) Marist 61
Berkeley region:
(11) Mississippi State 71, (6) Texas 63
(3) Ohio State 77, (14) Sacred Heart 63
(10) San Diego State 76, (7) DePaul 70
(2) Stanford 74, (15) UC Santa Barbara 39
Raleigh region:
(4) Vanderbilt 73, (13) Western Carolina 44
(5) Kansas State 68, (12) Drexel 44
Oklahoma City region:
(3) North Carolina 85, (14) UCF 80
(6) Purdue 65, (11) Charlotte 52
(2) Auburn 85, (15) Lehigh 49
(7) Rutgers 56, (10) Virginia Commonwealth 49
(4) Pittsburgh 64, (13) Montana 35
(12) Gonzaga 74, (5) Xavier 59

Cricket
India in New Zealand:
1st Test in Hamilton, day 4:
 279 and 279;  520 and 39/0. India win by 10 wickets, lead 3-match series 1–0.
Australia in South Africa:
3rd Test in Cape Town, day 3:
 209 and 102/2;  651 (Jacques Kallis 102, AB de Villiers 163). Australia trail by 340 runs with 8 wickets remaining.
Women's World Cup in Australia:
3rd place play-off:
 142 (44.4/46 ov);  145/7 (43.5/46 ov) in Bankstown. India win by 3 wickets (D/L method).
5th place play-off:
 131 (46.3 ov);  135/7 (46.3 ov) in Drummoyne. West Indies win by 3 wickets.

Rugby union
Six Nations Championship, week 5:
 8–50  in Rome
France win their third consecutive Giuseppe Garibaldi Trophy.
 26–12  in London
England win the 121st Calcutta Cup.
 15–17 Ireland in Cardiff
Ronan O'Gara scores a drop goal with three minutes remaining to give Ireland their first Six Nations title since 1985, and also their first Grand Slam since 1948 and fourth Triple Crown in the last six years.

Winter sports

Biathlon
World Cup 8 in Trondheim, Norway:
12.5 km pursuit men: (1) Ole Einar Bjørndalen  33min 18.3sec (2) (2) Simon Eder  at 25.1sec (1) (3) Tomasz Sikora  25.3 (2)
Overall World Cup standings (after 22 of 26 races): (1) Bjørndalen 864 points (2) Sikora 828 (3) Maxim Tchoudov  709
World Cup pursuit standings (after 6 of 7 events): (1) Bjørndalen 288 points (2) Sikora 276 (3) Emil Hegle Svendsen  248
10 km pursuit women: (1) Andrea Henkel  30:08.8 0 penalty (10th) (2) Olga Zaitseva  at 12.9 1 (1st) (3) Marie-Laure Brunet  28.3 1 (6th)
Overall World Cup standings (after 22 of 26 races): (1) Helena Jonsson  865 points (2) Wilhelm 832 (3) Magdalena Neuner  762
World Cup pursuit standings (after 6 of 7 races): (1) Wilhelm 272 points (2) Martina Beck  235 (3) Tora Berger  234

Cross-country skiing
World Cup in Falun, Sweden:
20 km pursuit men: (1) Dario Cologna  54:59.5 (2) Marcus Hellner  55:01.2 (3) Tobias Angerer  55:01.9
10 km pursuit women: (1) Riitta-Liisa Roponen  29mins 24.7secs (2) Therese Johaug  at 1.3 (3) Justyna Kowalczyk  4.2

Curling
World Women's Championship in Gangneung, South Korea:
Draw 1:
 Norway 2–10  Denmark
 Italy 2–7  Sweden
 South Korea 4–6  Scotland
 Switzerland 7–5  Germany
Draw 2:
 Scotland 11–2  Italy
 Canada 11–5  China
 Russia 7–5  United States
 South Korea 8–10  Sweden (12 ends)
Standings after 2 draws: Scotland, Sweden 2–0, Canada, Denmark, Russia, Switzerland 1–0, China, Germany, Norway, USA 0–1, Italy, Korea 0–2.

Ski jumping
World Cup in Planica, Slovenia:
Team HS215: (1)  793.4 points (Tom Hilde, Johan Remen Evensen, Anders Jacobsen, Anders Bardal) (2)  761.9 (Kamil Stoch, Lukasz Rutkowski, Stefan Hula, Adam Małysz) (3)  734.6 (Denis Kornilov, Pavel Karelin, Ilja Roslakov, Dimitry Vassiliev)
One-jump only because of bad weather

Snowboarding
World Cup in Valmalenco, Italy:
Halfpipe men: (1) Gary Zebrowski  (2) Nathan Johnstone  (3) Zeng Xiaoye 
Halfpipe women: (1) Liu Jiayu  (2) Holly Crawford  (3) Sarah Conrad

March 20, 2009 (Friday)

Basketball
NCAA Division I Men's Tournament:
First round (seeding in parentheses):
Midwest region:
(1) Louisville 74, (16) Morehead State 54
(9) Siena 74, (8) Ohio State 72 (2 OT)
(12) Arizona 84, (5) Utah 71
(13) Cleveland State 84, (4) Wake Forest 69
(3) Kansas 84, (14) North Dakota State 74
(11) Dayton 68, (6) West Virginia 60
(10) USC 72, (7) Boston College 55
(2) Michigan State 77, (15) Robert Morris 62
West region:
(6) Marquette 58, (11) Utah State 57
(3) Missouri 78, (14) Cornell 59
East region:
(8) Oklahoma State 77, (9) Tennessee 75
(1) Pittsburgh 72, (16) East Tennessee State 62
(4) Xavier 77, (13) Portland State 59
(12) Wisconsin 61, (5) Florida State 59 (OT)
South region:
(3) Syracuse 59, (14) Stephen F. Austin 44
(6) Arizona State 66, (11) Temple 57

Cricket
India in New Zealand:
1st Test in Hamilton, day 3:
 279 and 75/3;  520 (Sachin Tendulkar 160). New Zealand trail by 166 runs with 7 wickets remaining.
Australia in South Africa:
3rd Test in Cape Town, day 2:
 209;  404/3 (Ashwell Prince 150, Jacques Kallis 102*). South Africa lead by 195 runs with 7 wickets remaining in the 1st innings.
England in West Indies:
1st ODI in Providence, Guyana:
 270/7 (50 ov);  244/7 (46.2 ov). England win by 1 run (D/L method), lead 5-match series 1–0.
After losing their seventh wicket, the West Indies batsmen are offered the light and take it, believing that they would win the match. However, this turned out to be wrong as the West Indies required a score of 246 after 46.2 overs under the Duckworth–Lewis method in order to win the match.

Winter sports

Cross-country skiing
World Cup in Falun, Sweden:
3.3 km freestyle sprint men: (1) Axel Teichmann  8min 33.1sec (2) Dario Cologna  at 0.2sec (3) Martin Koukal  5.3
2.5 km freestyle sprint women: (1) Claudia Nystad  7min 12.5sec (2) Charlotte Kall  at 2.7sec (3) Justyna Kowalczyk  3.0

Freestyle skiing
World Cup in La Plagne, France:
Skicross men:
Skicross women:

Ski jumping
World Cup in Planica, Slovenia:
HS215: (1) Gregor Schlierenzauer  196.1pts (203.0m), (2) Adam Małysz  195.0 (202.5), (3) Dimitry Vassiliev  193.6 (200.5)
The second round of the competition was cancelled due to unstable wind conditions.
Schlierenzauer win his 13th competition of the season, which is a new single-season record.
Overall World Cup standings (after 26 of 27 events): (1) Schlierenzauer 2038pts, (2) Simon Ammann  1716, (3) Wolfgang Loitzl  1378

Snowboarding
World Cup in Valmalenco, Italy:
Snowboardcross men: (1) Michal Novotny  (2) Nick Baumgartner  (3) David Speiser 
Snowboardcross women: (1) Maëlle Ricker  (2) Dominique Maltais  (3) Zoe Gillings

March 19, 2009 (Thursday)

Baseball
World Baseball Classic:
Pool 1 in: San Diego, California, United States:
 6–2 
 The semifinals are now set, with Japan facing Team USA and South Korea facing Venezuela.

Basketball
NCAA Division I Men's Tournament:
First round (seeding in parentheses):
West region:
(9) Texas A&M 79, (8) Brigham Young 66
(1) Connecticut 103, (16) Chattanooga 47
(5) Purdue 61, (12) Northern Iowa 56
(4) Washington 71, (13) Mississippi State 58
(2) Memphis 81, (15) Cal State Northridge 70
(10) Maryland 84, (7) California 71
East region:
(3) Villanova 80, (14) American 67
(6) UCLA 65, (11) Virginia Commonwealth 64
(7) Texas 76, (10) Minnesota 62
(2) Duke 86, (15) Binghamton 62
South region:
(8) LSU 75, (9) Butler 71
(1) North Carolina 101, (16) Radford 58
(4) Gonzaga 77, (13) Akron 64
(12) Western Kentucky 76, (5) Illinois 72
(10) Michigan 62, (7) Clemson 59
(2) Oklahoma 82, (15) Morgan State 54

Cricket
India in New Zealand:
1st Test in Hamilton, day 2:
 279;  278/4. India trail by 1 run with 6 wickets remaining in the 1st innings.
Australia in South Africa:
3rd Test in Cape Town, day 1:
 209;  57/0. South Africa trail by 152 runs with 10 wickets remaining in the 1st innings.
Women's World Cup in Australia:
Super Six's:
 161 (49.3 overs);  163/2 (33.5 overs) in North Sydney. Australia win by 8 wickets.
 84 (44.4 overs);  86/2 (17.5 overs) in Bankstown. India win by 8 wickets.
 373/7 (50.0 overs);  150 (48.1 overs) in Drummoyne. New Zealand win by 223 runs.
England and New Zealand will play in the final on Sunday. Australia and India will play for 3rd place.

Football (soccer)
UEFA Cup Round of 16, second leg:
Metalist Kharkiv  3–2  Dynamo Kyiv
3–3 on aggregate, Kyiv win by away goals rule.
Shakhtar Donetsk  2–0  CSKA Moscow
Donetsk win 2–1 on aggregate.
Zenit St. Petersburg  1–0  Udinese
Udinese win 2–1 on aggregate.
Galatasaray  2–3  Hamburg
Hamburg win 4–3 on aggregate.
Aalborg  2–0  Manchester City
2–2 on aggregate, Manchester City win 4–3 in penalty shootout.
Braga  0–1  Paris Saint-Germain
PSG win 1–0 on aggregate.
Copa Libertadores group stage:
Group 3:
Nacional  3–0  River Plate
Group 5:
Estudiantes  4–0  Deportivo Quito
2009 Major League Soccer season
Seattle Sounders FC  3-0  New York Red Bulls
Seattle win 3–0.

Winter sports

Biathlon
World Cup 8 in Trondheim, Norway:
Men's 10 km sprint (penalty laps in brackets): (1) Michael Greis  26:11.3 (0+0) (2) Ole Einar Bjørndalen  26:29.6 (1+0) (3) Simon Eder  26:43.1 (0+0)
Overall World Cup standings (after 21 of 26 rounds): (1) Bjørndalen 804 points (2) Tomasz Sikora  780 (3) Maxim Tchoudov  692
World Cup sprint standings (after nine of 10 rounds): (1) Sikora 337 points (2) Bjørndalen 318 (3) Alexander Os  290
Women's 7.5 km sprint (penalty laps in brackets): (1) Olga Zaitseva  22min 56.9sec (0), (2) Helena Jonsson  at 5.5sec (0), (3) Sylvie Becaert  11.1 (1)
Overall World Cup standings (after 21 of 26 rounds): (1) Jonsson 834 pts, (2) Kati Wilhelm  792, (3) Magdalena Neuner  739
World Cup sprint standings (after nine of 10 rounds): (1) Jonsson 362 pts, (2) Neuner 331, (3) Tora Berger  326

Freestyle skiing
World Cup in La Plagne, France:
Half-pipe men:
Half-pipe women:

March 18, 2009 (Wednesday)

Baseball
World Baseball Classic (teams in bold advance to the semifinals, team in italics eliminated):
Pool 1 in: San Diego, California, United States:
 5–0 
 In an elimination match, Japan defeats their 2006 final opponent for the second time in this pool, and will now face South Korea for semifinal seeding.
Pool 2 in Miami, Florida, United States:
 10–6 
 Venezuela wins Pool 2 and will play the loser of Korea-Japan game in the semifinal.

Basketball
NBA:
The Boston Celtics clinch the Atlantic Division title and at least a #4 seed in the playoff with a 112–108 overtime win over the Miami Heat. The Celtics trail Cleveland Cavaliers by 4 games in the race for the Eastern Conference top seed.

Cricket
India in New Zealand:
1st Test in Hamilton, day 1:
 279 (Jesse Ryder 102, Daniel Vettori 118);  29/0. India trail by 250 runs with 10 wickets remaining in the 1st innings.

Football (soccer)
UEFA Cup Round of 16, second leg:
Saint-Étienne  2–2  Werder Bremen
Bremen win 3–2 on aggregate.
Ajax  2–2(AET)  Marseille
Marseille win 4–3 on aggregate.
Copa Libertadores group stage:
Group 2:
Guaraní  1–3  Boca Juniors
Group 4:
Defensor Sporting  0–1  São Paulo
Group 5:
Cruzeiro  2–0  Universitario de Sucre
Group 7:
Boyacá Chicó  3–0  Universidad de Chile
Group 8:
San Lorenzo  0–1  Libertad
San Luis  2–2  Universitario
Libertad advance to the last-16 round.
CONCACAF Champions League semifinals, first leg:
Santos Laguna  2–1  Atlante
AFC Champions League group stage, matchday 2:
Group C:
Esteghlal  1–1  Al-Jazira
Umm-Salal  1–3  Al-Ittihad
Group D:
Al-Shabab Al-Arabi  2–0  Bunyodkor
Al-Ettifaq  2–1  Sepahan
Group G:
Kashima Antlers  2–0  Shanghai Shenhua
Singapore Armed Forces  0–2  Suwon Samsung Bluewings
Group H:
Pohang Steelers  1–1  Kawasaki Frontale
Tianjin Teda  2–2  Central Coast Mariners

Winter sports

Cross-country skiing
World Cup in Stockholm, Sweden:
Sprint classic men: (1) Johan Kjoestad  (2) John Kristian Dahl  (3) Eldar Roenning 
Sprint classic women: (1) Petra Majdič  (2) Aino-Kaisa Saarinen  (3) Anna Olsson

Freestyle skiing
World Cup in La Plagne, France:
Dual moguls men:
Dual moguls women:

March 17, 2009 (Tuesday)

American football
NFL news:
 President Barack Obama has nominated Pittsburgh Steelers owner Dan Rooney to be the next U.S. Ambassador to Ireland. (AP/ESPN)

Baseball
World Baseball Classic (teams in bold advance to the semifinals, team in italics is eliminated):
Pool 1 in: San Diego, California, United States:
 1–4 
South Korea scores 3 runs in the first inning and cruises into the semifinals. Japan now faces Cuba, with the winner advancing to the semifinals and the loser going home.
Pool 2 in Miami, Florida, United States:
 5–6 
David Wright hits a two-RBI single in the bottom of the ninth to put the US in the semifinals.

Basketball
NCAA Division I Men's Tournament:
Opening Round Game in Dayton, Ohio: Morehead State 58, Alabama State 43

Cricket
Women's World Cup in Australia:
Super Six's:
 207 (49.4 overs);  210/5 (47.4 overs) in North Sydney. New Zealand win by 5 wickets
 236/8 (50.0 overs);  90 (38.2 overs) in Drummoyne. England win by 146 runs
England (8 pts from 4 matches) advance to the final. New Zealand (6 pts), Australia or India (both 4 pts) could be their opponent.

Football (soccer)
Copa Libertadores group stage:
Group 2:
Deportivo Cuenca  3–1  Deportivo Táchira
Group 6:
Lanús  1–2  Everton
Group 4:
Independiente Medellín  0–0  América de Cali
CONCACAF Champions League semifinals, first leg:
Puerto Rico Islanders  2–0  Cruz Azul
AFC Champions League group stage, matchday 2:
Group A:
Saba Battery  0–0  Al-Ahli
Pakhtakor Tashkent  1–1  Al-Hilal
Group B:
Al-Shabab  0–0  Persepolis
Sharjah  0–2  Al-Gharafa
Group E:
Nagoya Grampus  0–0  Beijing Guoan
Newcastle United Jets  2–0  Ulsan Hyundai Horang-i
Group F:
Seoul  2–4  Gamba Osaka
Shandong Luneng Taishan  5–0  Sriwijaya

Ice hockey
NHL:
The New Jersey Devils' Martin Brodeur takes sole possession of the record for most regular-season NHL wins by a goaltender, collecting his 552nd in a 3–2 Devils victory over the Chicago Blackhawks.
The San Jose Sharks secure the Pacific Division title, as their nearest rivals, the Dallas Stars, lose 2–4 to the Vancouver Canucks.

March 16, 2009 (Monday)

Baseball
World Baseball Classic (team in bold advances to semifinals, team in italics eliminated):
Pool 1 in: San Diego, California, United States:
 7–4 
 Cuba eliminates Mexico and will play the Japan–South Korea loser for a semifinal place.
Pool 2 in Miami, Florida, United States:
 2–0 
Venezuela advances to the semifinals as Félix Hernández and relievers combine on a shutout.

Basketball
 Women's NCAA tournament #1 seeds:
 Trenton Region: Connecticut (overall #1 seed)
 Berkeley Region: Duke
 Raleigh Region: Maryland
 Oklahoma City Region: Oklahoma

Cricket
Women's World Cup in Australia:
Super Six's:
 229/6 (50 ov);  122 (45.1 ov) in Bankstown. Australia win by 107 runs.
Australia gets level with New Zealand and India in second place on 4 points, while Pakistan is out of contention for the final.

March 15, 2009 (Sunday)

Auto racing
World Rally Championship:
Cyprus Rally:
(1) Sébastien Loeb  (2) Mikko Hirvonen  (3) Petter Solberg 
Drivers overall standings: (1) Loeb 30 pts (2) Hirvonen 22 (3) Dani Sordo  17

Badminton
BWF Super Series:
Swiss Open Super Series in Basel:
Men's singles:  Lee Chong Wei
Women's singles:  Wang Yihan
Men's doubles:  Koo Kien Keat & Tan Boon Heong
Women's doubles:  Du Jing & Yu Yang
Mixed doubles:  Zheng Bo & Ma Jin

Baseball
World Baseball Classic (teams in italics eliminated):
Pool 1 in: San Diego, California, United States:
 6–0 
 2–8 
Pool 2 in Miami, Florida, United States:
 3–9

Basketball
US college basketball
Men's conference championship games — winners earn bids to the NCAA tournament
ACC in Atlanta: Duke 79, Florida State 69
Big Ten in Indianapolis: Purdue 65, Ohio State 61
SEC in Tampa: Mississippi State 64, Tennessee 61
Southland in Katy, Texas: Stephen F. Austin 68, Texas-San Antonio 57
 Men's NCAA Tournament #1 seeds:
 Midwest Region: Louisville (overall #1 seed)
 West Region: Connecticut
 East Region: Pittsburgh
 South Region: North Carolina
 For the first time ever, the same conference (the Big East) produces three #1 seeds.
Women's conference championship games — winners earn bids to the NCAA tournament
America East in West Hartford, Connecticut: Vermont 74, Boston University 66
Big South in High Point, North Carolina: Liberty 51, Gardner–Webb 50
Big 12 in Oklahoma City: Baylor 72, Texas A&M 63
CAA in Harrisonburg, Virginia: Drexel 64, James Madison 58
Horizon League in Green Bay, Wisconsin: UW-Green Bay 65, UW-Milwaukee 41
Mid-American in Cleveland: Ball State 55, Bowling Green 51
Missouri Valley in St. Charles, Missouri: Evansville 47, Creighton 45
NEC in Fairfield, Connecticut: Saint Francis 74. Sacred Heart 66
Pac-10 in Los Angeles: Stanford 89, USC 64
Canadian Interuniversity Sport Final 8 at Ottawa, Ontario:
 Consolation Final: (5) Ottawa Gee-Gees 83, (7) Concordia Stingers 76
 Championship final: (1) Carleton Ravens 87, (3) UBC Thunderbirds 77
 The Ravens win their sixth title in seven years, this time at home.  The Ravens will host the Final 8 again next year.  Stuart Turnbull was named game MVP in a 22-point outing.

Cricket
England in West Indies:
Only T20I in Port of Spain, Trinidad:
 121 (19.1/20 ov);  123/4 (18/20 ov). West Indies win by 6 wickets.

Football (soccer)

Scottish League Cup Final in Glasgow:
Celtic 2–0 (AET) Rangers

Golf
World Golf Championships:
WGC-CA Championship in Doral, Florida
Winner:  Phil Mickelson 269 (−19)
PGA Tour:
Puerto Rico Open in Río Grande, Puerto Rico
Winner:  Michael Bradley 274 (−14)

Ice hockey

NHL:
The Detroit Red Wings and San Jose Sharks are the first two teams to clinch playoff berths, with wins over the Columbus Blue Jackets and Anaheim Ducks respectively.

Rugby union
Six Nations Championship, week 4:
 34–10  in London
England jumps out to a 29–0 halftime lead and cruises from there. France's loss ends their championship hopes and means that the title will be decided in next week's Wales–Ireland match in Cardiff.

Winter sports

Alpine skiing
World Cup Final in Åre, Sweden:
Team event: (1)  (2)  (3)

Biathlon
World Cup 7 in Vancouver, British Columbia, Canada:
4 x 7.5 km relay men: (1)  (Vincent Ekholm, Mattias Nilsson, Fredrik Lindström, Carl Johan Bergman) 1hr 16min 18.6sec (0 penalty laps) (2)  (Vincent Jay, Vincent Defrasne, Martin Fourcade, Simon Fourcade) 6.3sec behind (0) (3)  (Simon Schempp, Daniel Böhm, Arnd Peiffer, Michael Rösch) 16.4sec behind (0)
Final overall relay standings (after 6 events): (1)  276 points (2)  254, (3) Germany 247

Freestyle skiing
World Cup in Meiringen–Hasliberg, Switzerland:
Skicross men:
Skicross women:

Nordic combined
World Cup in Vikersund, Norway:
Gundersen HS117/10 km: (1) Bill Demong  26mins 31.6secs (12th after ski jump) (2) Petter Tande  at 9.8 (17) (3) Mikko Kokslien  10.3 (34)
Final World Cup standings: (1) Anssi Koivuranta  1461 points (2) Magnus Moan  1350 (3) Demong 1060

Short track speed skating
World Team Championships in Heerenveen, Netherlands:

Ski jumping
Nordic Tournament:
World Cup in Vikersund, Norway:
HS207: (1) Gregor Schlierenzauer  386.4 points (207.5m/192.0m) (2) Simon Ammann  379.7 (191.0m/202.5m) (3) Dimitry Vassiliev (RUS) 372.2 (184.5m/204.0m)
Overall World Cup standings (after 25 of the 27 jumps): (1) Schlierenzauer 1938 points (2) Ammann 1676 (3) Wolfgang Loitzl  1356
Schlierenzauer secures the World Cup title, Amman will take the silver globe and Loitzl the bronze.

Snowboarding
World Cup in La Molina, Spain:
Parallel GS men:
Parallel GS women:

Speed skating
World Single Distances Championships in Richmond, British Columbia, Canada:

March 14, 2009 (Saturday)

Baseball
World Baseball Classic:
Pool 2 in Miami, Florida, United States:
 1–3 
 1–11  (7 innings, mercy rule)

Basketball
US college basketball
Men's conference championship games — winners earn bids to the NCAA tournament
America East in Vestal, New York: Binghamton 61, UMBC 51
 The Bearcats book their first-ever trip to "The Big Dance".
Atlantic 10 in Atlantic City, New Jersey: Temple 69, Duquesne 64
Big East in New York City: Louisville 76, Syracuse 66
Big 12 in Oklahoma City: Missouri 73, Baylor 60
Big West in Anaheim, California: Cal State Northridge 71, Pacific 65
Conference USA in Memphis: Memphis 64, Tulsa 39
 The Tigers extend their winning streak in C-USA play to 61 and state their case for a #1 seed.
MEAC in Winston-Salem, North Carolina: Morgan State 83, Norfolk State 69
Mid-American in Cleveland: Akron 65, Buffalo 53
Mountain West in Las Vegas: Utah 52, San Diego State 50
Pac-10 in Los Angeles: USC 66, Arizona State 63
SWAC in Birmingham, Alabama: Alabama State 65, Jackson State 58
WAC in Reno, Nevada: Utah State 72, Nevada 62
Women's conference championship games — winners earn bids to the NCAA tournament
Big Sky in Missoula, Montana: Montana 69, Portland State 62
Big West in Anaheim, California: UC Santa Barbara 64, Cal Poly 57
MEAC in Winston-Salem, North Carolina: North Carolina A&T 76, Hampton 54
Mountain West in Las Vegas: Utah 63, San Diego State 58
Southland in Katy, Texas: UTSA 74, Texas–Arlington 63
SWAC in Birmingham, Alabama: Prairie View 74, Southern 49
WAC in Reno, Nevada: Fresno State 56, Nevada 49
In another women's game:
Old Dominion's 62–41 loss to Drexel in the semifinals of the CAA tournament ends the Lady Monarchs' NCAA Division I record of 17 consecutive conference tournament titles.
Canadian Interuniversity Sport Final 8:
 Consolation round:
 (7) Concordia Stingers 72, (6) Dalhousie Tigers 61
 (5) Ottawa Gee-Gees 85, (8) St.FX X-Men 63
 Semifinals:
 (3) UBC Thunderbirds 79, (2) Calgary Dinos 74
 (1) Carleton Ravens 66, (4) Western Ontario Mustangs 65

Cricket
India in New Zealand:
5th ODI in Auckland:
 149 (36.3/43 ov);  151/2 (23.2/43 ov). New Zealand win by 8 wickets. India win 5-match series 3–1.
Women's World Cup in Australia:
Super Six's:
 234/5 (50 ov);  218/7 (50 ov)  in North Sydney. India win by 16 runs.
 201/5 (50 ov);   170 (48.4 ov) in Bankstown. England win by 31 runs.
 132/9 (50 ov);  134/6 (47.5 ov) in Drummoyne. Pakistan win by 4 wickets.
Standings after 3 of 5 matches: England 6 points, India & New Zealand 4, Australia & Pakistan 2, West Indies 0.
7th place playoff:
 75 (39 ov);  76/1 (28.3 ov) in North Sydney. South Africa win by 9 wickets.

Ice hockey
NHL:
New Jersey Devils goaltender Martin Brodeur collects his 551st regular-season NHL win in a 3–1 victory over the Montreal Canadiens, tying the record of Patrick Roy.

Motorcycle racing
Superbike World championship:
Losail Superbike World Championship round in Doha, Qatar
Superbike:
Race 1: (1) Ben Spies  (2) Noriyuki Haga  (3) Max Biaggi 
Race 2: (1) Spies (2) Haga (3) Biaggi
Riders' standings (after 2 of 14 events): (1) Haga 85 points (2) Spies 75 (3) Max Neukirchner  40
Supersport:
(1) Eugene Laverty  (2) Andrew Pitt  (3) Cal Crutchlow 
Riders' standings (after 2 of 14 events): (1) Pitt 40 points (2) Kenan Sofuoğlu  38 (3) Laverty 36

Rugby union
Six Nations Championship, week 4:
 15–20  in Rome
 15–22 Ireland in Edinburgh
Ireland remain on track for a potential Grand Slam. A win or draw against Wales next week in Cardiff will secure them the championship. Wales must win by at least 13 points to win the title. France could also be the winner, if they beat England in London on Sunday and Italy in Rome next week, and Wales beat Ireland.

Winter sports

Alpine skiing
World Cup Final in Åre, Sweden
Slalom men: (1) Mario Matt  1:45.71 (54.24 + 51.47) (2) Julien Lizeroux  1:45.80 (54.06 + 51.74) (3) Jean-Baptiste Grange  1:45.86 (54.72 + 51.14)
Final World Cup overall standings: (1) Aksel Lund Svindal  1009 points (2) Benjamin Raich  1007 (3) Didier Cuche  919
Final World Cup slalom standings: (1) Grange 541 (2) Ivica Kostelic  454 (3) Lizeroux 419
Giant slalom women: (1) Tina Maze  2:26.41 (1:13.74 + 1:12.67) (2) Tanja Poutiainen  2:27.53 (1:14.32 + 1:13.21) (3) Manuela Moelgg  2:27.80 (1:14.76 + 1:13.04)
Final World Cup overall standings: (1) Lindsey Vonn  1788 points (2) Maria Riesch  1404 (3) Anja Paerson  1059
Final World Cup giant slalom standings: (1) Poutiainen 508 (2) Kathrin Zettel  501 (3) Maze 368

Biathlon
World Cup 7 in Vancouver, British Columbia, Canada:
4 x 6 km relay women: (1)  (Kati Wilhelm, Magdalena Neuner, Martina Beck, Andrea Henkel) 1:11:49.8 (2)  (Wang Chunli, Liu Xianying, Dong Xue, Liu Yuan-Yuan) 1:13:05.0 (3)  (Svetlana Sleptsova, Anna Boulygina, Olga Medvedtseva, Olga Zaitseva) 1:13:40.3
Final World Cup relay standings: (1) Germany 288 points (2)  242 (3)  232

Cross-country skiing
World Cup in Trondheim, Norway:
50 km mass start classic men: (1) Sami Jauhojärvi  2:02:39.0 (2) Tobias Angerer  at 21.8 (3) Alex Harvey  33.2
Overall World Cup standings (after 28 of the 32 races): (1) Petter Northug  1042 points (2) Dario Cologna  1022 (3) Ola Vigen Hattestad  760
30 km mass start classic women: (1) Petra Majdič  1:25:22.2 (2) Justyna Kowalczyk  at 11.7 (3) Masako Ishida  12.0
Overall World Cup standings (after 28 out of 32 races): (1) Majdic 1567 points (2) Kowalczyk 1476 (3) Aino-Kaisa Saarinen  1365

Nordic combined
World Cup in Vikersund, Norway:
Gundersen HS117/10 km: (1) Anssi Koivuranta  (2) Bill Demong  (3) Magnus Moan 
World Cup standings (after 22 of 23 events): (1) Koivuranta 1429 points (2) Moan  1330 (3) Demong 1060
Koivuranta need only to finish in 29th place in the last event on Sunday to win the World Cup title.

Ski jumping
Nordic Tournament:
World Cup in Vikersund, Norway:
Team HS207: (1)  1543.5 pts (Martin Koch, Wolfgang Loitzl, Thomas Morgenstern, Gregor Schlierenzauer) (2)  1499.0 (Matti Hautamäki, Kalle Keituri, Ville Larinto, Harri Olli) (3)  1485.0 (Johan Remen Evensen, Bjørn Einar Romøren, Anders Bardal, Anders Jacobsen)

Snowboarding
World Cup in La Molina, Spain:
Halfpipe men:
Halfpipe women:

March 13, 2009 (Friday)

Basketball
NBL Grand Final:
Game 5 in Melbourne, Australia:
South Dragons 102–81 Melbourne Tigers. Dragons win series 3–2.
NBA:
The Cleveland Cavaliers clinch the Central Division title for the first time in 33 years, with 126–123 win in overtime over Sacramento Kings.
US college basketball:
Men's conference championship game — winner earns a bid to the NCAA tournament
Patriot League in Washington, D.C.: American 73, Holy Cross 57
Canadian Interuniversity Sport Final 8 quarterfinals at Ottawa, Ontario: (CIS ranking in parentheses)
(4) Western Ontario Mustangs 75, (5) Ottawa Gee-Gees 48
(1) Carleton Ravens 94, (8) St. FX X-Men 57
(2) Calgary Dinos 76, (7) Concordia Stingers 67
(3) UBC Thunderbirds 78, (6) Dalhousie Tigers 54

Winter sports

Alpine skiing
World Cup Final in Åre, Sweden
Giant slalom men: (1) Benjamin Raich  2:18.95 (1:09.94 + 1:09.01) (2) Ted Ligety  2:19.08 (1:10.65 + 1:08.43) (3) Didier Cuche  2:19.66 (1:10.80 + 1:08.86)... 19. Aksel Lund Svindal  2:20.96 (1:11.93 + 1:09.03)
World Cup overall standings (after 36 of 37 events): (1) Svindal 1009 points (2) Raich 1007 (3) Cuche 919
The overall title will be decided on the last race of the season, the slalom on Saturday.
World Cup giant slalom standings (after all eight events): (1) Cuche 474 points (champion) (2) Raich 462 (3) Ligety 421
Slalom women: (1) Sandrine Aubert  1:49.23 (52.27+56.96) (2) Fanny Chmelar  1:49.29 (52.89+56.40) (3) Therese Borssen  1:49.46 (52.77+56.69) & Šárka Záhrobská  1:49.46 (51.80+57.66)
World Cup overall standings (after 33 of 34 events): (1) Lindsey Vonn  1788 points (champion) (2) Maria Riesch  1404 (3) Anja Pärson  1059
World Cup slalom standings (after all nine events): (1) Riesch 625 points (champion) (2) Záhrobská 459 (3) Vonn 440

Biathlon
World Cup 7 in Vancouver, British Columbia, Canada:
7.5 km sprint women: (1) Helena Jonsson  19:43.6 (0+0) (2) Magdalena Neuner  19:44.3 (0+1) (3) Olga Zaitseva  19:45.2 (0+0)
Sprint World Cup standings (after 8 of 10 events): (1) Neuner 315 points (2) Jonsson 308 (3) Kati Wilhelm  298
Overall World Cup standings (after 20 of 26 events): (1) Jonsson 780 points (2) Wilhelm 764 (3) Neuner 723
10 km sprint men: (1) Lars Berger  24:06.5 (0) (2) Ole Einar Bjørndalen  at 14.1 (0) (3) Christoph Sumann  39.5 (0)
Overall World Cup sprint standings (after eight of 10 rounds): (1) Tomasz Sikora  309 points (2) Bjørndalen 264 (3) Emil Hegle Svendsen  245
Overall World Cup standings (after 20 of 26 rounds): (1) Sikora 752 points (2) Bjørndalen 750 (3) Maxim Tchoudov  649

Ski jumping
Nordic Tournament:
World Cup in Lillehammer, Norway:
HS138: (1) Harri Olli  288.7pts (135.5/142.0 m), (2) Dimitry Vassiliev  275.2 (137.0/133.0), (3) Gregor Schlierenzauer  268.9 (128.5/138.0)
Overall standings (after 24 of 27 rounds): (1) Schlierenzauer 1838 points, (2) Simon Ammann  1596, (3) Wolfgang Loitzl  1340
Schlierenzauer need just 59 more points to secure the World Cup title.

Snowboarding
World Cup in La Molina, Spain:
Snowboardcross men:
Snowboardcross women:

March 12, 2009 (Thursday)

Baseball
World Baseball Classic:(teams in bold advance to the second round)
Pool B in Mexico City, Mexico:
 4–16  (7 innings, via mercy rule)

Basketball
Euroleague Top 16, week 6 (teams in bold advance to the quarterfinals):
Group E:
TAU Cerámica  80–88  Olympiacos
Olympiacos defeats TAU in Vitoria-Gasteiz to claim first place in the group.
AJ Milano  72–96  Asseco Prokom Sopot
 Prokom win their only game in the Top 16 phase.
Group F:
Maccabi Tel Aviv  74–90  Regal FC Barcelona
Barça secures first place in the group with a win in Tel Aviv. Maccabi is 0–6 against Spanish opponents this season.
Real Madrid  83–82  ALBA Berlin
Real's win at the buzzer leaves ALBA the only winless team in the Top 16 phase.
Quarterfinal matchups (first named team has home advantage in best-of-five series):
 Olympiacos vs. Real
 Barça vs. TAU
US college basketball:
Big East quarterfinals in New York City: Syracuse 127, Connecticut 117 (6OT)
This is the second-longest game in NCAA history, and the longest since the shot clock era.
NBA:
The Los Angeles Lakers clinch the Pacific Division title and the first playoff berth in the Western Conference with a 102–95 win over the San Antonio Spurs.

Cricket
Women's World Cup in Australia:(teams in bold advance to Super Six stage)
Group A:
 211/7 (50 ov);  164/7 (50 ov) in Drummoyne. Australia win by 47 runs.
 250/5 (50 ov);  51 (22.1 ov) in Bowral. New Zealand win by 199 runs.
Group B:
 78 (39.5 ov);  82/2 (23.1 ov) in North Sydney. England win by 8 wickets.
 137/7 (50 ov);  102 (44.2 ov) in Bankstown. India win by 35 runs.

Football (soccer)
UEFA Cup Round of 16, first leg:
Werder Bremen  1–0  Saint-Étienne
CSKA Moscow  1–0  Shakhtar Donetsk
Udinese  2–0  Zenit St. Petersburg
Paris Saint-Germain  0–0  Braga
Dynamo Kyiv  1–0  Metalist Kharkiv
Manchester City  2–0  Aalborg
Marseille  2–1  Ajax
Hamburg  1–1  Galatasaray
Copa Libertadores group stage:
Group 1:
Colo-Colo  3–0  LDU Quito
Group 3:
U. San Martín  2–1  Nacional

Winter sports

Alpine skiing
World Cup Final in Åre, Sweden
Super giant slalom men: (1) Werner Heel  1min 13.41sec (2) Aksel Lund Svindal  1:13.48 (3) Christof Innerhofer  1:13.61
World Cup overall standings (after 35 of 37 events): (1) Svindal 1009 points (2) Benjamin Raich  907 (3) Didier Cuche  859
Final World Cup Super-G standings (after all five events): (1) Svindal (NOR) 292 (winner) (2) Heel 256 (3) Didier Defago  242
Super giant slalom women: (1) Lindsey Vonn  1min 20.63sec (2) Nadia Fanchini  1:20.71 (3) Maria Riesch  1:20.87
World Cup overall standings (after 32 of 34 events): (1) Vonn 1788 points (winner) (2) Riesch 1359 (3) Anja Paerson  1035
Final World Cup Super-G standings (after all seven events): (1) Vonn 461 pts (winner) (2) Fanchini 416 (3) Fabienne Suter  408

Cross-country skiing
World Cup in Trondheim, Norway:
Sprint classic men: (1) Ola Vigen Hattestad  (2) Petter Northug  (3) Jon Kristian Dahl 
World Cup sprint standings (after 11 of 12 events): (1) Hattestad 760 points (winner) (2) Tor Arne Hetland  353 (3) Renato Pasini  335
Overall World Cup standings (after 27 of 32 events): (1) Dario Cologna  1006 points (2) Northug 952 (3) Hattestad 760
Sprint classic women: (1) Petra Majdič  (2) Alena Prochazkova  (3) Justyna Kowalczyk 
World Cup sprint standings (after 11 of 12 events): (1) Majdic 825 points (winner) (2) Arianna Follis  454 (3) Pirjo Muranen  421
Overall World Cup standings (after 27 of 32 events): (1) Majdic 1462 points (2)  Kowalczyk 1351 (3) Aino-Kaisa Saarinen  1321

Freestyle skiing
World Cup in Grindelwald, Switzerland:
Skicross men:
Skicross women:

March 11, 2009 (Wednesday)

Baseball
World Baseball Classic:(teams in bold advance to the second round, teams in italics are eliminated)
Pool B in Mexico City, Mexico:
 16–1  (6 innings, via mercy rule)
Pool C in Toronto, Canada:
 5–3 
Pool D in San Juan, Puerto Rico:
 0–5

Basketball
Euroleague Top 16, week 6 (teams in bold advance to the quarterfinals):
Group G:
Panathinaikos  103–95 (OT)  Unicaja Málaga
Lottomatica Roma  88–72  Partizan Igokea
Roma's only win in the Top 16 phase hands first place in the group to Panathinaikos, even before their overtime win.
Group H:
Cibona Zagreb  63–73  CSKA Moscow
Fenerbahçe Ülker  68–73  Montepaschi Siena
Quarterfinal matchups (first named team has home advantage in best-of-five series):
 Panathinaikos vs. Montepaschi
 CSKA vs. Partizan
US college basketball:
Men's conference championship games — winners earn bids to the NCAA tournament
Big Sky in Ogden, Utah: Portland State 79, Montana State 77
Northeast Conference in Moon Township, Pennsylvania: Robert Morris 48, Mount St. Mary's 46
Women's conference championship game — winner earns a bid to the NCAA tournament
Patriot League in Bethlehem, Pennsylvania: Lehigh 64, Lafayette 56
NBA:
The Orlando Magic become the third team to clinch a playoff berth with their 107–79 win over the Chicago Bulls, combined with the New Jersey Nets' 116–112 loss to the Golden State Warriors.

Cricket
India in New Zealand:
4th ODI in Hamilton:
 270/5 (47/47 ov);  201/0 (23.3/23.3 ov, Virender Sehwag 125*). India win by 84 runs (D/L method), lead 5-match series 3–0.

Football (soccer)
UEFA Champions League First knockout round, second leg:
Porto  0–0  Atlético Madrid
2–2 on aggregate. Porto advance on away goals rule.
Barcelona  5–2  Lyon
Barcelona win 6–3 on aggregate.
Roma  1–0  Arsenal
1–1 on aggregate. Arsenal win 7–6 on penalties after extra time.
Manchester United  2–0  Internazionale
Manchester United win 2–0 on aggregate.
All four English teams – Chelsea, Liverpool, Arsenal and Manchester United – are through to the quarterfinals, while all Italian teams are out of the competition.
Copa Libertadores group stage:
Group 2:
Deportivo Táchira  1–0  Deportivo Cuenca
Group 6:
Everton  1–1  Lanús
Guadalajara  1–0  Caracas
Group 7:
Boyacá Chicó  0–1  Grêmio
AFC Champions League group stage, matchday 1:
Group A:
Al-Hilal  1–1  Saba Battery
Group C:
Al-Jazira  0–1  Umm-Salal
Al-Ittihad  2–1  Esteghlal
Group D:
Sepahan  2–0  Al-Shabab
Bunyodkor  2–1  Al-Ettifaq
Group G:
Suwon Bluewings  4–1  Kashima Antlers
Shanghai Shenhua  4–1  SAFFC
Group H:
Central Coast Mariners  0–0  Pohang Steelers
Kawasaki Frontale  1–0  Tianjin Teda

Winter sports

Alpine skiing
World Cup Final in Åre, Sweden
Downhill men: (1) Aksel Lund Svindal  1min 22.26sec (2) Didier Cuche  1:22.46 (3) Hans Olsson  1:22.62
Overall World Cup standings (after 34 of 37 events) (1) Svindal 929 points (2) Benjamin Raich  857 (3) Cuche 843
Final World Cup downhill standings (after all nine events): (1) Michael Walchhofer  470 pts (champion) (2) Klaus Kroell  424 (3) Didier Defago  363
Downhill women: (1) Lindsey Vonn  1min 42.49sec (2) Maria Riesch  1:42.89 (3) Renate Goetschl  1:43.75
Overall World Cup standings (after 31 of 34 events): (1) Vonn 1688 points (champion) (2) Riesch 1299 (3) Anja Paerson  990
Final World Cup Downhill standings (after all seven events): (1) Vonn 502 pts (champion) (2) Andrea Fischbacher  326 (3) Riesch 292

Biathlon
World Cup 7 in Vancouver, British Columbia, Canada:
15 km individual women: (1) Simone Hauswald  42min 44.6sec (0) (2) Olga Zaitseva  39.3sec (1) (3) Vita Semerenko  1:05.8 (1)
Final World Cup 15 km standings (after 4 events): (1) Magdalena Neuner  129 points (2) Éva Tófalvi  123 (3) Tora Berger  122
Overall World Cup standings (after 19 of 26 events): (1) Kati Wilhelm  730 points (2) Helena Jonsson  720 (3) Neuner 669
20 km individual men: (1) Vincent Jay  49min 53.9sec 0 penalty (2) Daniel Boehm  at 19.0 1 (3) Jeremy Teela  23.3 1
Final World Cup 20 km standings (after all four events): (1) Michael Greis  146 points (2) Ivan Tcherezov  120 (3) Maxim Tchoudov  119
World Cup overall standings (after 19 of 26 events): (1) Tomasz Sikora  726 points (2) Ole Einar Bjørndalen  696 (3) Tchoudov 635

March 10, 2009 (Tuesday)

Baseball
World Baseball Classic:(teams in bold advance to the second round, teams in italics are eliminated)
Pool B in Mexico City, Mexico:
 5–4 
Cuba advances, Australia plays Mexico to determine the other advancement slot.
Pool C in Toronto, Canada:
 1–10 
Venezuela advance to the second round, and will play USA on Wednesday to decide the group winner.
Pool D in San Juan, Puerto Rico:
 1–2 , 11 innings
The Dutch shock the Dominicans for the second time, scoring two runs off Carlos Mármol in the bottom of the 11th inning.

Basketball
US college basketball
Men's conference championship games — winners earn bids to the NCAA tournament
Horizon League in Indianapolis:  Cleveland State 57, Butler 54
The Summit in Sioux Falls, South Dakota: North Dakota State 66, Oakland 64
 The Bison become the first men's team since Southwestern Louisiana, now Louisiana–Lafayette, in 1972 to make the "Big Dance" in their first year of postseason eligibility.
Sun Belt in Hot Springs, Arkansas: Western Kentucky 64, South Alabama 56
Women's conference championship games — winners earn bids to the NCAA tournament
Big East in Hartford, Connecticut: Connecticut 75, Louisville 36
The Summit in Sioux Falls, South Dakota: South Dakota State 79, Oakland 69
 The Jackrabbits make the "Big Dance" in their first season of postseason eligibility.
Sun Belt in Hot Springs, Arkansas: Middle Tennessee 74, Arkansas-Little Rock 54
 Other women's games:
 Dartmouth claims the Ivy League regular-season crown and the league's automatic bid to the NCAA tournament with a 64–51 home win over Harvard.

Cricket
England in West Indies:
5th Test in Port of Spain, Trinidad, day 5:
 546/6d and 237/6d (Kevin Pietersen 102) ;  544 and 114/8. Match drawn. West Indies win series 1–0.
Australia in South Africa:
2nd Test in Durban, day 5:
 352 and 331/5d;  138 and 370. Australia win by 175 runs, lead 3-match series 2–0
Women's World Cup in Australia:(teams in bold advance to the Super Six stage)
Group A:
 192/8 (50 ov);  136/8 (50 ov) in Bankstown. New Zealand win by 56 runs.
 258/4 (50 ov);  197 (49.3 ov) in Newcastle. Australia win by 61 runs.
Group B:
 169 (48.4 ov);  172/1 (38.4 ov) in North Sydney. England win by 9 wickets.

Football (soccer)
UEFA Champions League First knockout round, second leg:
Panathinaikos  1–2  Villarreal
Villarreal win 4–3 on aggregate.
Liverpool  4–0  Real Madrid
Liverpool win 5–0 on aggregate.
Bayern  7–1  Sporting CP
Bayern win 12–1 on aggregate, the biggest aggregate score in Champions League history.
Juventus  2–2  Chelsea
Chelsea win 3–2 on aggregate.
Copa Libertadores group stage:
Group 4:
América de Cali  1–1  Independiente Medellín
Group 5:
Deportivo Quito  1–0  Estudiantes
Group 8:
Universitario  0–0  San Luis
AFC Champions League group stage, matchday 1:
Group A:
Al-Hilal  –  Saba Battery
postponed because of a sandstorm
Al-Ahli  1–2  Pakhtakor
Group B:
Persepolis  3–1  Sharjah
Al-Gharafa  1–3  Al-Shabab
Group E:
Ulsan Hyundai  1–3  Nagoya Grampus
Beijing Guoan  2–0  Newcastle Jets
Group F:
Gamba Osaka  3–0  Shandong Luneng
Sriwijaya  2–4  Seoul

Winter sports

Ski jumping
Nordic Tournament:
World Cup in Kuopio, Finland:
HS127: (1) Takanobu Okabe  241.7 points (123.5/123.0m) (2) Simon Ammann  240.4 (119.5/126.0) (3) Adam Małysz  239.3 (119.0/127.0)
Okabe wins his first World Cup in 11 years and becomes the oldest ever World Cup winner in ski jumping.
World Cup standings (after 23 of 27 events): (1) Gregor Schlierenzauer  1778 points (2) Ammann 1578 (3) Wolfgang Loitzl  1300

March 9, 2009 (Monday)

Baseball
World Baseball Classic:(teams in bold advance to the second round, teams in italics are eliminated)
Pool A in Tokyo, Japan:
 1–0 
South Korea win the rematch in the game between both Pool A qualifiers, which only determined seeding for the next round.
Pool B in Mexico City, Mexico:
 3–14 
South Africa is eliminated. Mexico will next play the loser of Cuba vs. Australia.
Pool C in Toronto, Canada:
 2–6 
Italy and Venezuela will play to determine which team joins the United States in advancing from Pool C.
Pool D in San Juan, Puerto Rico:
 1–3 
Netherlands next plays a rematch against the Dominican Republic, with the winner advancing and the loser eliminated.

Basketball
US college basketball
Men's conference championship games — winners earn bids to the NCAA tournament
CAA in Richmond, Virginia: Virginia Commonwealth 71, George Mason 50
MAAC in Albany, New York: Siena 77, Niagara 70
Southern in Chattanooga, Tennessee: Chattanooga 80, College of Charleston 69
West Coast in Paradise, Nevada: Gonzaga 83, Saint Mary's 58
Women's conference championship games — winners earn bids to the NCAA tournament
Atlantic 10 in Charlotte: Charlotte 59, Richmond 54
Southern in Chattanooga, Tennessee: Western Carolina 101, College of Charleston 87 (3 OT)
West Coast in Paradise, Nevada: Gonzaga 66, San Diego 56

Cricket
England in West Indies:
5th Test in Port of Spain, Trinidad, day 4:
 546/6d and 80/3;  544 (Brendan Nash 109, Chris Gayle 102, Shivnarine Chanderpaul 147*). England lead by 82 runs with 7 innings remaining.
Australia in South Africa:
2nd Test in Durban, day 4:
 352 and 331/5d (Phillip Hughes 160);  138 and 244/2. South Africa trail by 301 runs with 8 wickets remaining.
Women's World Cup in Australia:
Group B:
 161/7 (50 ov);  104 (39.4 ov) in Canberra. Pakistan win by 57 runs.

March 8, 2009 (Sunday)

Athletics
European Indoor Championships in Turin, Italy, day 3:
Men:
Shot put:  Tomasz Majewski  21.02 metres  Yves Niaré  20.42  Ralf Bartels  20.39
Pole vault:  Renaud Lavillenie  5.81 metres  Pavel Gerasimov  5.76  Alexander Straub  5.76
Heptathlon:  Mikk Pahapill  6362 points  Oleksiy Kasyanov  6205  Roman Šebrle  6142
800 m:  Yuriy Borzakovskiy  1:48.55  Luis Alberto Marco  1:49.14  Mattias Claesson  1:49.32
Long jump:  Sebastian Bayer  8.71 metres  Nils Winter  8.22  Marcin Starzak  8.18
1500 m:  Rui Silva  3:44.38  Diego Ruiz  3:44.70  Yoann Kowal  3:44.75
60 m:  Dwain Chambers  6.46 seconds  Fabio Cerutti  6.56  Emanuele di Gregorio  6.56
Women:
Triple jump:  Anastasiya Taranova-Potapova  14.68 metres  Marija Šestak  14.60  Dana Veldáková  14.40
High jump:  Ariane Friedrich  2.01 metres  Ruth Beitia  1.99  Viktoriya Klyugina  1.96
800 m:  Mariya Savinova  1:58.10  Oksana Zbrozhek  1:59.20  Elisa Cusma Piccione  2:00.23
3,000 m:  Alemitu Bekele  8:46.50  Sara Moreira  8:48.18  Mary Cullen  8:48.47
60 m:  Yevgeniya Polyakova  7.18 seconds  Ezinne Okparaebo  7.21  Verena Sailer  7.22

Auto racing
Sprint Cup Series:
Kobalt Tools 500 in Hampton, Georgia
(1) Kurt Busch  (2) Jeff Gordon  (3) Carl Edwards 
Drivers' standings (after 4 races): (1) Gordon 634 points (2) Clint Bowyer  591 (3) Kurt Busch 588
WTCC:
HSBC Race of Brazil in Curitiba, Brazil:
Round 1: (1) Yvan Muller  (2) Jordi Gené  (3) Rickard Rydell 
Round 2: (1) Gabriele Tarquini  (2) Rydell (3) Gené
Drivers' standings (after 2 of 24 events): (1) Muller & Tarquini 15 points (3) Rydell & Gené 14

Badminton
BWF Super Series:
All England Super Series in Birmingham:(Seeding in parentheses)
Men's singles: Lin Dan  (2) bt Lee Chong Wei  (1) 21–19, 21–12
Women's singles: Wang Yihan  bt Tine Rasmussen  (1) 21–19, 21–23, 21–11
Men's doubles: Cai Yun/Fu Haifeng  (7) bt Han Sang Hoon/Hwang Ji Man  21–17, 21–15
Women's doubles: Zhang Yawen/Zhao Tingting  (7) bt Cheng Sui/Zhao Yunlei  21–13, 21–15
Mixed doubles: He Hanbin/Yu Yang  (3) bt Ko Sung Hyun/Ha Jung Eun  13–21, 21–15, 21–9

Baseball
World Baseball Classic:(teams in bold advance to the second round, teams in italics are eliminated)
Pool A in Tokyo, Japan:
 0–14  (via mercy rule)
Korea will play against Japan on Monday to decide the group winner.
Pool B in Mexico City, Mexico:
 1–8 
Cuba hit 6 home runs.
 17–7  (mercy rule)
Australia score 13 unanswered runs from 4–7 down after 4 innings, and set a WBC record of 22 hits.
Pool C in Toronto, Canada:
 15–6 
The U.S. scores 8 runs in the 6th inning and advances to the second round. Venezuela next plays the winner of Canada vs Italy on Tuesday.
Pool D in San Juan, Puerto Rico:
 9–0 
Panama is eliminated, while the Dominicans will next play the loser of Netherlands vs Puerto Rico on Tuesday.

Basketball
US college basketball
Men's conference championship game — winner earns a bid to the NCAA tournament
Missouri Valley in St. Louis: Northern Iowa 60, Illinois State 57 (OT)
 Women's conference championship games — winners earn bids to the NCAA tournament
 ACC in Greensboro, North Carolina: Maryland 92, Duke 89 (OT)
 Big Ten in Indianapolis: Ohio State 67, Purdue 66
 Conference USA in New Orleans: UCF 65, Southern Miss 54 (OT)
 MAAC in Albany, New York: Marist 78, Canisius 63
 SEC in North Little Rock, Arkansas: Vanderbilt 61, Auburn 54

Cricket
England in West Indies:
5th Test in Port of Spain, Trinidad, day 3:
 546/6d;  349/4 (Chris Gayle 100 retired hurt). West Indies trail by 197 runs with 6 wickets remaining in the 1st innings.
Australia in South Africa:
2nd Test in Durban, day 3:
 352 and 292/3 (Phillip Hughes 136*);  138. Australia lead by 506 runs with 7 wickets remaining.
Hughes scores his second century of the match.
India in New Zealand:
3rd ODI in Christchurch:
 392/4 (50/50 ov, Sachin Tendulkar 163);  334 (45.1/50 ov, Jesse Ryder 105). India win by 58 runs, lead 5-match series 2–0.
The aggregate total of 726 runs is the second-highest in the history of One Day Internationals.
Women's World Cup in Australia:
Group A:
 205 (48/50 ov);  132/6 (33/50 ov) in North Sydney. New Zealand win by 13 runs (D/L).
 116 (45.2/50 ov);  117/8 (48.4/50 ov) in Newcastle. West Indies win by 2 wickets.

Football (soccer)
African Championship of Nations:
 Final:
 0–2 
 DR Congo win the inaugural edition of the tournament.

Golf
PGA Tour:
Honda Classic in Palm Beach Gardens, Florida
Winner:  Yang Yong-eun 271 (−9)
LPGA Tour:
HSBC Women's Champions in Singapore
Winner:  Jiyai Shin 277 (−11)

Tennis
Davis Cup:
World Group first round, day 3:(Teams in bold advance to the quarterfinals)
 5–0  in Buenos Aires, Argentina
 3–2  in Ostrava, Czech Republic
Radek Štěpánek beat Gilles Simon 7–6(2) 6–3 7–6(0) in the fourth rubber to put Czech Republic through to a quarterfinals tie at home against Argentina.
 4–1  in Birmingham, Alabama, United States
Andy Roddick clinch the decisive point for USA for the 11th time in a Davis Cup tie, defeating Stanislas Wawrinka 6–4 6–4 6–2.
 5–0  in Poreč, Croatia
Croatia will host USA in the quarterfinals.
 2–3  in Malmö, Sweden
Israel advance to the quarterfinals for just the second time in its Davis Cup history, after wins for Dudi Sela over Thomas Johansson and Harel Levy over Andreas Vinciguerra, both in five sets. For Sweden it's the first defeat ever after leading 2–1.
 1–4  in Sibiu, Romania
Dmitry Tursunov come back from two sets down to beat Victor Hănescu and book Russia's trip to Israel in the quarterfinals.
 3–2  in Garmisch-Partenkirchen, Germany
Nicolas Kiefer clinch victory for Germany with 7–6(3) 6–4 6–4 win over Jürgen Melzer in the fourth rubber. Austria lose in the first round for the sixth successive year.
 4–1  in Benidorm, Spain
World No. 1 Rafael Nadal defeat Novak Djokovic 6–4 6–4 6–1 and sends Spain, the defending champion, to a quarterfinals tie at home against Germany.
WTA Tour:
Monterrey Open in Monterrey, Mexico
Final:  Marion Bartoli def.  Li Na 6–4, 6–3

Winter sports

Alpine skiing
Men's World Cup in Kvitfjell, Norway:
Super giant slalom: Cancelled

Cross-country skiing
World Cup in Lahti, Finland:
15 km freestyle men: (1) Alexander Legkov  33min 5.9sec (2) Pietro Piller Cottrer  at 7.5 (3) Christian Hoffmann  20.7
World Cup standings (after 26 of 32 events): (1) Dario Cologna  991 points (2) Petter Northug  872 (3) Axel Teichmann  663
10 km freestyle women: (1) Justyna Kowalczyk  24min 38.6sec (2) Charlotte Kalla  at 22.4 (3) Marthe Kristoffersen  27.1
World Cup standings (after 26 of 32 events): (1) Petra Majdič  1362 points (2) Kowalczyk 1291 (3) Aino-Kaisa Saarinen  1276

Freestyle skiing
World Championships in Inawashiro, Japan:
Dual moguls men:  Alexandre Bilodeau   Jesper Bjoernlund   Tapio Luusua 
Dual moguls women:  Aiko Uemura   Miki Ito   Hannah Kearney 
Uemura wins her second title of the championships.

Short track speed skating
World Championships in Vienna, Austria:

Ski jumping
Nordic Tournament:
World Cup in Lahti, Finland:
HS97: (1) Gregor Schlierenzauer  242.0 points (92.5/92.5m) (2) Simon Ammann  236.0 (90.5/94.5) (3) Dimitry Vassiliev  234.0 (94.5/90.0)
The competition was moved from the 130m hill due to poor wind conditions.
World Cup standings (after 22 of 27 events): (1) Schlierenzauer 1752 points (2) Ammann 1498 (3) Wolfgang Loitzl  1268

March 7, 2009 (Saturday)

Athletics
European Indoor Championships in Turin, Italy, day 2:
Men:
High jump:  Ivan Ukhov  2.32 metres  Kyriakos Ioannou  2.29  Aleksey Dmitrik  2.29
Triple jump:  Fabrizio Donato  17.59 metres  Viktor Yastrebov  17.25  Igor Spasovkhodskiy  17.15
3,000 m:  Mo Farah  7:40.17  Bouabdellah Tahri  7:42.14  Jesús España  7:43.29
400 m:  Johan Wissman  45.89 seconds  Claudio Licciardello  46.32  Ioan Vieru  46.54
Women:
Pole vault:  Yuliya Golubchikova  4.75 metres  Silke Spiegelburg  4.75  Anna Battke  4.65
Long jump:  Ksenija Balta  6.87 metres  Yelena Sokolova  6.84  Olga Kucherenko  6.82
1,500 m:  Anna Alminova  4:07.76  Natalia Rodríguez  4:08.72  Sonja Roman  4:11.42
400 m:  Antonina Krivoshapka  51.18 seconds  Nataliya Pyhyda  51.44  Darya Safonova  51.85

Baseball
World Baseball Classic:(teams in bold advance to the second round, teams in italics are eliminated)
Pool A in Tokyo, Japan:
 4–1 
Chinese Taipei is the first team eliminated from the competition.
 14–2  (via mercy rule)
Japan advance to the second round, while Korea will play against China on Sunday for the second berth from this pool.
Pool C in Toronto, Canada:
 5–6 
 0–7 
Pool D in San Juan, Puerto Rico:
 2–3 
 0–7

Basketball
US college basketball
Men's conference championship games — winners earn bids to the NCAA tournament
Atlantic Sun in Nashville: East Tennessee State 85, Jacksonville 68
Big South in Radford, Virginia: Radford 108, VMI 94
Ohio Valley in Nashville: Morehead State 67, Austin Peay 65 (2 OT)
Women's conference championship games — winners earn bids to the NCAA tournament
Atlantic Sun in Nashville: East Tennessee State 58, Jacksonville 52
Ohio Valley in Nashville: Austin Peay 69, Eastern Illinois 65 (2 OT)

Cricket
England in West Indies:
5th Test in Port of Spain, Trinidad, day 2:
 546/6d (Andrew Strauss 142, Paul Collingwood 161, Matt Prior 131*);  92/1. West Indies trail by 454 runs with 9 wickets remaining in the 1st innings.
Australia in South Africa:
2nd Test in Durban, day 2:
 352;  138/7. South Africa trail by 214 runs, with three wickets remaining in the 1st innings.
Women's World Cup in Australia:
Group B:
 57 (29 ov);  58/0 (10 ov) in Bowral. India win by 10 wickets.
 277/5 (Claire Taylor 101);  177/7 in Canberra. England win by 100 runs.

Football (soccer)
OFC Champions League Group stage, matchday 5:(teams in italics are eliminated)
Group A: Port Vila Sharks  2–3  Waitakere United
Waitakere gets level with Auckland on 7 points, ahead of their match on April 5 in Waitakere.
Group B: PRK Hekari United  1–0  Koloale FC Honiara
Hekari goes to the top of the group on 6 points, with Koloale and Ba, who meet in the last match, on 4 points.

Rugby union
World Cup Sevens in Dubai:
Women's final:  10–15 
Men's final:  19–12 

Tennis
Davis Cup:(teams in bold advance to the quarterfinals)
World Group first round, day 2:
 3–0  in Buenos Aires, Argentina
Lucas Arnold Ker and Martín Vassallo Argüello see Argentina through to the quarterfinals for the eighth straight year with a comfortable 6–4 7–5 6–3 victory against Jesse Huta Galung and Rogier Wassen.
 2–1  in Ostrava, Czech Republic
Tomáš Berdych and Radek Štěpánek's four-set defeat of Richard Gasquet and Michaël Llodra give the Czechs the lead.
 2–1  in Birmingham, Alabama, United States
Bob and Mike Bryan beat Yves Allegro and Stanislas Wawrinka 6–3, 6–4, 3–6, 7–6(2) for their 15th Davis Cup win and put USA ahead in the tie.
 3–0  in Poreč, Croatia
Mario Ančić and Marin Čilić seal Croatia's place in the next round, defeating Paul Capdeville and Nicolás Massú 6–3 6–3 3–6 6–4.
 2–1  in Malmö, Sweden
While Simon Aspelin and Robert Lindstedt beat Andy Ram and Amir Hadad 6–4 1–6 7–6(4) 6–4 in the near-empty arena to give Sweden the lead in the tie, a crowd of 7000 people hold a demonstration against Israel recent military operation in Gaza Strip near the stadium, and several demonstrators who throw rocks and fire crackers at the police force and try to break into the Baltic Hall are arrested.
 1–2  in Sibiu, Romania
Marius Copil and Horia Tecău come back from two sets down to produce a surprise victory over Marat Safin and Dmitry Tursunov and keep Romanian hopes alive.
 2–1  in Garmisch-Partenkirchen, Germany
Philipp Kohlschreiber and Nicolas Kiefer defeat Julian Knowle and Alexander Peya 6–3 7–6(6) 3–6 6–4 to give Germany the lead.
 2–1  in Benidorm, Spain
David Ferrer and Rafael Nadal both win the singles matches postponed from day 1 in straight sets and put Spain 2–0 ahead. Victor Troicki and Nenad Zimonjić keep Serbia in contention by winning the doubles rubber 7–6(5) 6–4 7–6(7) over Feliciano López and Tommy Robredo.

Winter sports

Alpine skiing
Women's World Cup in Ofterschwang, Germany:
Slalom: (1) Sandrine Aubert  1:46.28 (53:54 + 52.74) (2) Frida Hansdotter  1:46.71 (53.87 + 52.84) (3) Nicole Hosp  1:47.10 (54.67 + 52.43)
Overall World Cup standings (after 30 of 34 races): (1) Lindsey Vonn  1588 points (2) Maria Riesch  1219 (3) Anja Pärson  990
Vonn need just 32 more points in the remaining 4 races to clinch the title.
Slalom standings (after 8 of 9 races): (1) Riesch 625 points (2) Vonn 440 (3)  Šárka Záhrobská  399
Riesch secure the slalom World Cup title.
Men's World Cup in Kvitfjell, Norway:
Downhill: (1) Klaus Kroll  1min 32.12sec (2) Michael Walchhofer  1:32.39 (3) Manuel Osborne-Paradis  1:32.58
Overall World Cup standings (after 33 of 38 races): (1) Ivica Kostelic  & Benjamin Raich  837 points (3) Aksel Lund Svindal  829
Downhill standings (after 8 of 9): (1) Walchhofer 470 pts (2) Kroll 395 (3) Didier Défago  337
Walchhofer need 10th place in the last race to secure the downhill title if Kroll wins, or 25th place if Kroll is second.

Cross-country skiing
World Cup in Lahti, Finland:
1.5 km sprint freestyle men: (1) Petter Northug  (2) Ola Vigen Hattestad  (3) Nikolay Morilov 
Overall World Cup standings (after 25 of 32 events): (1) Dario Cologna  939 points (2) Northug 836 (3) Axel Teichmann  663
Sprint standings (after 10 of 12 events): (1) Hattestad (NOR) 660 points (secure sprint World Cup title) (2) Tor Arne Hetland  335 (3) Renato Pasini  321
1.3 km sprint freestyle women: (1) Petra Majdič  (2) Arianna Follis  (3) Pirjo Muranen 
Overall World Cup standings (after 25 of 32 events): (1) Majdic 1350 points (2) Aino-Kaisa Saarinen  1276 (3) Justyna Kowalczyk  1191
Sprint standings (after 10 of 12 events): (1) Majdic 725 points (secure sprint World Cup title) (2) Muranen 421 (3) Follis 414

Freestyle skiing
World Championships in Inawashiro, Japan:
Moguls men:  Patrick Deneen  23.41 points  Tapio Luusua  21.89  Vincent Marquis  21.66
Moguls women:  Aiko Uemura  24.71  Jennifer Heil  22.88  Nikola Sudová  21.76

Nordic combined
World Cup in Lahti, Finland:
Gundersen HS130/10 km: (1) Magnus Moan  26:34.5 (2) Anssi Koivuranta  26:34.5 (3) Bill Demong  26:37.0
World Cup standings (after 21 of 23 events): (1) Koivuranta 1329 points (2) Moan 1270 (3) Demong 980

Ski jumping
Nordic Tournament:
World Cup in Lahti, Finland:
Team HS130: (1)  1017.5 points (Wolfgang Loitzl, Martin Koch, Thomas Morgenstern, Gregor Schlierenzauer) (2)  1013.8 (Ville Larinto, Kalle Keituri, Harri Olli, Matti Hautamäki) (3)  996.8 Anders Bardal, Tom Hilde, Johan Remen, Anders Jacobsen

Snowboarding
World Cup in Moscow, Russia:
Big Air men: (1) Stefan Gimpl  (2) Thomas Franc  (3) Marko Grilc 

Speed skating
World Cup Final in Salt Lake City, United States:
500 m women: (1) Wang Beixing  37.25 (2) Jenny Wolf  +0.14 (3) Yu Jing  +0.37
1000 m men: (1) Shani Davis  1:06.42 WR (2) Trevor Marsicano  +0.46 (3) Denny Morrison  +0.69
1500 m women: (1) Kristina Groves  1:54.08 (2) Maki Tabata  +0.71 (3) Brittany Schussler  +0.83
5000 m men: (1) Sven Kramer  6:06.64 (2) Håvard Bøkko  +3.30 (3) Carl Verheijen  +6.53
100 m women: (1) Jenny Wolf  10.25 (2) Yu Jing  +0.19 (3) Shihomi Shinya  +0.20
100 m men: (1) Yuya Oikawa  9.49 (2) Lee Kang-seok  +0.14 (3) Yu Fengtong  +0.31

March 6, 2009 (Friday)

Athletics
European Indoor Championships in Turin, Italy, day 1:
Men:
60 m hurdles:  Ladji Doucouré  7.55 seconds  Gregory Sedoc  7.55  Petr Svoboda  7.61
Women:
Shot put:  Petra Lammert  19.66 metres  Denise Hinrichs  19.63  Anca Heltne  18.71
Pentathlon:  Anna Bogdanova  4761 points  Jolanda Keizer  4644  Antoinette Nana Djimou Ida  4618
60 m hurdles:  Eline Berings  7.92 seconds  Lucie Škrobáková  7.94  Derval O'Rourke  7.97

Baseball
World Baseball Classic:
Pool A in Tokyo, Japan:
 0–9 
A six-run first inning including a grand slam from Lee Jin-Young lead to Korea's easy win.

Basketball
U.S. college basketball:
 Cornell clinches its second straight Ivy League title with an 83–59 home win over Penn, and becomes the first team to secure a bid to the NCAA tournament.

Cricket
England in West Indies:
5th Test in Port of Spain, Trinidad, day 1:
 258/2 (Andrew Strauss 139*)
Australia in South Africa:
2nd Test in Durban, day 1:
 303/4 (Phillip Hughes 115, Simon Katich 108)
India in New Zealand:
2nd ODI in Wellington:
 188/4 (28.4/34 ov). No result, India lead 5-match series 1–0.

Tennis
Davis Cup:
World Group first round, day 1:
 2–0  in Buenos Aires, Argentina
 1–1  in Ostrava, Czech Republic
 1–1  in Birmingham, Alabama, United States
Andy Roddick beat Marco Chiudinelli for his 30th win in Davis Cup, which puts him level with Andre Agassi in 6th place on USA all-time list.
 2–0  in Poreč, Croatia
 1–1  in Malmö, Sweden
The tie is being played in crowd-less arena for fear of anti-Israeli disturbances.
 0–2  in Sibiu, Romania
 1–1  in Garmisch-Partenkirchen, Germany
 0–0  in Benidorm, Spain
The first day singles matches were postponed to Saturday.

Winter sports

Alpine skiing
Women's World Cup in Ofterschwang, Germany:
Giant slalom: (1) Kathrin Zettel  2min 36:48sec (1:19.56 + 1:19.92) (2) Elisabeth Gorgl  2:36.60 (1:20:05 + 1:16.55) (3) Tanja Poutiainen  2:37:00 (1:20.09 + 1:16.91)
World Cup overall standings (after 29 of 34 events): (1) Lindsey Vonn  1588 points (2) Maria Riesch  1174 (3) Anja Pärson  990
Vonn needs just 87 more points to secure the World Cup title.
Men's World Cup in Kvitfjell, Norway:
Downhill: (1) Manuel Osborne-Paradis  1min 47.09sec (2) Michael Walchhofer  1:47.40 (3) Aksel Lund Svindal  1:47.46
World Cup overall standings (after 32 of 38 events): (1) Ivica Kostelic  & Benjamin Raich  837 points (3) Svindal 811

Nordic combined
World Cup in Lahti, Finland:
Gundersen HS130/10 km: (1) Bill Demong  26:10.8 (6th place after jump) (2) Anssi Koivuranta  at 7.2 (1) (3) Jason Lamy-Chappuis  11.5 (2)
Overall World Cup standings (after 20 out 23 races): (1) Koivuranta 1249 points (2) Magnus Moan  1170 (3) Demong 720

Speed skating
World Cup Final in Salt Lake City, United States:
500 m men: (1) Yu Fengtong  34.37 (2) Lee Kyou-hyuk  +0.01 (3) Tucker Fredricks  +0.14
1000 m women: (1) Anni Friesinger 1:13.86 (2) Sayuri Yoshii  +0.19 (3) Christine Nesbitt  +0.55
1500 m men: (1) Shani Davis  1:41.80 WR (2) Trevor Marsicano  +0.51 (3) Denny Morrison  +0.76
3000 m women: (1) Martina Sáblíková  3:58.62 (2) Daniela Anschütz-Thoms  +1.26 (3) Kristina Groves  +1.38

March 5, 2009 (Thursday)

Baseball
World Baseball Classic:
Pool A in Tokyo, Japan:
 0–4 
Japan begin the defense of its title with a win, thanks to a two-run homer from Shuichi Murata in the third inning and a no-hitter through four innings by Yu Darvish.

Basketball
Euroleague Top 16, week 5:(teams in bold advance to the quarterfinals, teams in italics are eliminated)
Group E:
Olympiacos  84–81  AJ MilanoBoth Olympiacos and TAU Cerámica clinch quarterfinal berths. The winner of their showdown next week in Vitoria-Gasteiz will finish atop the group.
Group F:ALBA Berlin  70–76  Maccabi Tel AvivMaccabi fail to advance to the quarterfinals after 8 successive seasons. ALBA remain winless in the Top 16 stage.
Group G:
Partizan Igokea  63–56  Panathinaikos
In front of a Euroleague-record crowd of 22,567 at Belgrade Arena, Partizan draw level with Panathinaikos atop the group, although PAO holds the tiebreaker.
Group H:
Montepaschi Siena  86–70  Cibona ZagrebMontepaschi get the 7-point win they needed to punch their quarterfinal ticket. The result also assures that CSKA Moscow will finish atop the group.

Football (soccer)
Copa Libertadores group stage:
Group 3:
U. San Martín  2–1  River Plate
Group 4:
América de Cali  1–3  São Paulo
Group 8:
Libertad  2–0  San Lorenzo
CONCACAF Champions League Quarterfinals, second leg:
Santos Laguna  5–2  Montreal Impact
2 late goals by Carlos Quintero give Santos Laguna a 5–4 aggregate win and a semifinals match with Atlante.

Winter sports

Freestyle skiing
World Championships in Inawashiro, Japan:
Half-pipe men:  Kevin Rolland  45.5 points  Justin Dorey  45.3  Xavier Bertoni  43.5
Half-pipe women:  Virginie Faivre  40.4  Megan Gunning (CAN) 40.2  Jen Hudak  38.4

March 4, 2009 (Wednesday)

Basketball
Euroleague Top 16, week 5:(teams in bold advance to the quarterfinals, teams in italics are eliminated)
Group E:Asseco Prokom Sopot  72–92  TAU Cerámica
TAU all but mathematically qualify to the quarterfinals. They will definitely do so if Olympiacos beat Milano on Thursday.
Group F:
Regal FC Barcelona  90–79  Real Madrid
Barcelona's win gives them a quarterfinal berth and the tie-break advantage over their Spanish rivals.
Group G:Unicaja Málaga  99–64  Lottomatica RomaGroup H:
CSKA Moscow  77–60  Fenerbahçe Ülker''
CSKA's win gives them a quarterfinal berth, while Fenerbahçe is eliminated.
NBA:
The Cleveland Cavaliers and Boston Celtics clinch the first two playoff berths, with wins over the Milwaukee Bucks and New Jersey Nets respectively.

Football (soccer)
Copa Libertadores group stage:
Group 1:
Sport Recife  2–0  LDU Quito
Group 2:
Deportivo Táchira  0–1  Boca Juniors
Group 5:
Universitario de Sucre  0–1  Cruzeiro
Group 7:
Universidad de Chile  3–0  Aurora
CONCACAF Champions League Quarterfinals, second leg:(Aggregate score in parentheses)
Marathón  0–1 (1–3)  Puerto Rico Islanders
UNAM  0–1 (0–2)  Cruz Azul
Puerto Rico and Cruz Azul will meet in the semifinals.

Winter sports

Freestyle skiing
World Championships in Inawashiro, Japan:
Aerials men:  Ryan St Onge   Steve Omischl   Warren Shouldice 
Aerials women:  Li Nina   Xu Mengtao   Jacqui Cooper

March 3, 2009 (Tuesday)

American football
National Football League:
The United States Coast Guard ends the search for three missing people, including football players Marquis Cooper and Corey Smith.

Cricket
Sri Lanka in Pakistan:
2nd Test in Lahore, day 3:
 606;  110/1. Match abandoned. 2-match series drawn 0–0.
The Test match and the series are abandoned following a terrorist attack against the Sri Lankan team as they were on the way to the ground for the third day's play. Seven players and assistant coach Paul Farbrace are injured, but none seriously. (Cricinfo), (BBC)
India in New Zealand:
1st ODI in Napier:
 273/4 (MS Dhoni 84*, Virender Sehwag 77, 38/38 ov);  162/9 (Martin Guptill 64, 28/28 ov). India win by 53 runs (D/L method) and lead the 5-match series 1–0.

Football (soccer)
Copa Libertadores group stage:
Group 1:
Palmeiras  1–3  Colo-Colo
Group 6:
Caracas  2–0  Guadalajara
CONCACAF Champions League Quarterfinals, second leg:
Atlante  3–0  Houston Dynamo
Atlante wins 4–1 on aggregate.

March 2, 2009 (Monday)

Cricket
England in West Indies:
4th Test in Bridgetown, Barbados, day 5:
 600/6d & 279/2 (Alastair Cook 139*);  749/9d. Match drawn, West Indies lead 5-match series 1–0.
Australia in South Africa:
1st Test in Johannesburg, day 5:
 466 and 207;  220 and 291. Australia win by 162 runs, lead 3-match series 1–0.
Sri Lanka in Pakistan:
2nd Test in Lahore, day 2:
 606 (Thilan Samaraweera 214, Tillakaratne Dilshan 145, Kumar Sangakkara 104);  110/1. Pakistan trail by 496 runs with 9 wickets remaining in the 1st innings.

Winter sports

Freestyle skiing
World Championships in Inawashiro, Japan:
Skicross men:  Andreas Matt   Thomas Zangerl   Davey Barr 
Skicross women:  Ashleigh McIvor   Karin Huttary   Meryl Boulangeat

March 1, 2009 (Sunday)

Auto racing
Sprint Cup Series:
Shelby 427 in Las Vegas, Nevada:
(1) Kyle Busch  (2) Clint Bowyer  (3) Jeff Burton 
Drivers' standings (after 3 races): (1) Jeff Gordon  459 points (2) Bowyer 441 (3) Matt Kenseth  419

Cricket
England in West Indies:
4th Test in Bridgetown, Barbados, day 4:
 600/6d & 6/0;  749/9d (Ramnaresh Sarwan 291, Denesh Ramdin 166). England trail by 143 runs with 10 wickets remaining.
Sarwan and Ramdin put on 261 for the sixth wicket as West Indies post their third-highest score ever, and the ninth-highest total in history.
Australia in South Africa:
1st Test in Johannesburg, day 4:
 466 & 207 (Phillip Hughes 75);  220 & 178/2 (Graeme Smith 69). South Africa require another 276 runs to win with 8 wickets remaining.
Sri Lanka in Pakistan:
2nd Test in Lahore, day 1:
 317/4 (Thilan Samaraweera 133*)

Football (soccer)
Football League Cup Final in London:
Tottenham Hotspur 0–0 (aet) Manchester United
Manchester United win 4–1 on penalties.

Motorcycle racing
Phillip Island World Championship round in Phillip Island, Victoria, Australia:
Superbike:
Race 1: (1) Noriyuki Haga  (2) Max Neukirchner  (3) Yukio Kagayama 
Race 2: (1) Ben Spies  (2) Haga (3) Leon Haslam 
Riders standings (after 1 of 14 events): (1) Haga 45 points (2) Neukirchner 30 (3) Haslam 26
Supersport:
(1) Kenan Sofuoğlu  (2) Andrew Pitt  (3) Anthony West 
Riders standings (after 1 of 14 events): (1) Sofuoğlu 25 points (2) Pitt 20 (3) West 16

Golf
World Golf Championships:
WGC-Accenture Match Play Championship in Marana, Arizona:
Final: Geoff Ogilvy  def.  Paul Casey 4 & 3
Playoff for 3rd place: Stewart Cink  def.  Ross Fisher 1 up
PGA Tour:
Mayakoba Golf Classic at Riviera Maya in Cancún, Mexico:
Winner:  Mark Wilson 267 (−13)
European Tour:
Astro Indonesia Open in Bali, Indonesia:
Winner:  Thongchai Jaidee 276 (−12)
LPGA Tour:
Honda LPGA Thailand in Bangkok, Thailand:
Winner:  Lorena Ochoa 274 (−14)

Rugby league
World Club Challenge in Leeds, England:
Leeds Rhinos  20–28  Manly-Warringah Sea Eagles

Tennis
ATP Tour:
Delray Beach International Tennis Championships in Delray Beach, Florida, United States:
Final:  Mardy Fish def.  Evgeny Korolev 7–5, 6–3

Winter sports

Alpine skiing
Women's World Cup in Bansko, Bulgaria:
Super giant slalom: (1) Lindsey Vonn  1min 14.49sec (2) Fabienne Suter  1:15.07 (3) Tina Maze  1:15.40
Overall World Cup standings (after 28 of 34 races): (1) Vonn 1556 points (2) Maria Riesch  1165 (3) Anja Paerson  986
Men's World Cup in Kranjska Gora, Slovenia:
Slalom: (1) Julien Lizeroux  1:40.11 (48.91 + 51.20) (2) Giuliano Razzoli  1:40.45 (48.74 + 51.71) (3) Felix Neureuther  1:40.67 (49.27 + 51.40)
Overall World Cup standings (after 31 of 38 races): (1) Ivica Kostelic  837 points (2) Benjamin Raich  835 (3) Jean-Baptiste Grange  777

Bobsleigh
World Championships at Lake Placid, New York, United States:
Four-man: (1)  (Steven Holcomb, Justin Olsen, Steve Mesler, Curtis Tomasevicz) 3:36.61 (2)  (André Lange, Alexander Rödiger, Kevin Kuske, Martin Putze) + 0.97 (3)  (Jānis Miņins, Daumants Dreiškens, Oskars Melbārdis, Intars Dambis) + 1.00
United States wins its first World Championships bobsleigh title in 50 years and Latvia wins its first ever medal.

Cross-country skiing
Nordic World Ski Championships in Liberec, Czech Republic:
50 km Freestyle Mass Start men: (1) Petter Northug  1hr 59.38.1 (2) Maxim Vylegzhanin  at 0.7sec (3) Tobias Angerer  2.0
Northug wins his third title of the championships, and the Norwegian men win five out of six cross country gold medals to finish on top of the medals standings. Angerer wins his third medal of the championships and sixth medal of his career, but none of them is gold.

References

3